= List of people from Dubrovnik =

This is a list of notable people who were born or have lived in the Croatian city of Dubrovnik, ordered by century of birth and alphabetically. This includes people born in the Republic of Ragusa (1358–1808), a maritime republic corresponding to the present-day city and its surrounding area.

== 14th–18th century ==
- Francesco Maria Appendini (1768–1837), Italian priest, philologist and linguist.
- Vito Maria Bettera-Vodopić (1771–1841), military officer and politician.
- Ruđer Bošković (1711–1787), scientist, diplomat and poet.
- Marin Držić (1508–1567), playwright and prose writer.
- Marin Getaldić (1568–1626), scientist.
- Vlaho Getaldić (1788–1872), politician and poet.
- Ivan Gundulić (1589–1638), poet.
- Ivan Rabljanin (1470–1540), technology and artist.
- Luka Radovanović (c. 1425–1502), bookbinder and owner of the first printing press in Ragusa.
- Joakim Stulli (1729–1817), Franciscan, lexicographer.
- Mavro Vetranović (1482–1576), poet and writer.
- Dinko Zlatarić (1558–1613), poet and translator.
- Cvijeta Zuzorić (c. 1552–c. 1600), poet.
- Junije Palmotić (1606–1657), baroque writer, poet and dramatist.
- Ivan Bunić Vučić (1592–1658), politician and poet.
- Nikola Božidarević (c. 1460–1517), painter.
- Nikola Božidarević (1642–1699), professor.
- Džore Držić (1461–1501), poet and playwright.
- Marin Držić (1508–1567), playwright and prose writer.
- Ignjat Đurđević (1675–1737), baroque poet, translator, historian, astronomer and Benedict monk.
- Nikola Vitov Gučetić (1549–1610), statesman, philosopher and science writer.
- Đivo Šiškov Gundulić (1678–1721), poet, dramatist and nobleman.
- Trojan Gundulić (1500–1555), merchant and printer.
- Benedikt Kotruljević (1416–1469), merchant, economist, scientist, diplomat and humanist. Wrote the earliest description of double-entry bookkeeping.
- Šiško Menčetić (1457–1527), poet.
- Luka Sorkočević (1734–1789), composer.
- Dinko Zlatarić (1558–1613), poet and translator.

== 19th century ==
- Lujo Adamović (1864–1935), Croatian botanist.
- Matija Ban (1818–1903), poet, dramatist, and playwright.
- Blagoje Bersa (1873–1934), Croatian musician.
- Pero Budmani (1835–1914), Croatian linguist.
- Vlaho Bukovac (1855–1922), Croatian painter.
- Jelena Dorotka (1876–1965), Croatian painter.
- Antun Fabris (1864–1904), journalist and politician.
- Frano Getaldić-Gundulić (1833–1899), soldier, statesman, nobleman, Knight of Malta.
- Nikša Gradi (1825–1894), Croatian lawyer and writer.
- Ignjat Job (1895–1936), Croatian painter.
- Ernest Katić (1883–1955), Croatian writer, collector and culture worker.
- Antun Paško Kazali (1815–1894), Catholic priest and writer.
- Miho Klaić (1829–1896), Croatian politician.
- Stijepo Kobasica (1882–1944), journalist, author and politician.
- Eduard Miloslavić (1884–1952), Croatian scientist.
- Marko Murat (1864–1944), painter.
- Vlaho Paljetak (1893–1944), Croatian composer.
- Medo Pucić (1821–1882), writer and politician.
- Niko Pucić (1820–1883), politician and nobleman.
- Milan Rešetar (1860–1942), linguist and historian.
- Federico Seismit-Doda (1825–1893), Italian politician.
- Ivan Stojanović (1829–1900), priest and writer.
- Frano Supilo (1870–1917), Croatian politician, journalist and publicist.
- Mato Vodopić (1816–1893), bishop of Dubrovnik and poet.
- Ivo Vojnović (1857–1929), writer.

== 20th century ==
- Adnan Aganović (born 1987), Croatian football player.
- Banu Alkan (born 1958), Turkish-Croatian actress.
- Mislav Anđelković (born 1988), Croatian football player.
- Dragan Andrić (born 1962), Croatian water polo player.
- Lukša Andrić (born 1985), Croatian basketball player.
- Srđan Andrić (born 1980), Croatian football player.
- Denis Bajramović (born 1961), Croatian basketball coach and former player.
- Maro Balić (born 1971), Croatian water polo player.
- Ivo Banac (born 1947), Croatian historian and politician, professor at Yale University.
- Nijaz Batlak (1929–1999), Croatian general.
- Branko Bauer (1921–2002), Croatian film director.
- Ivo Begović (born 1993), Croatian water polo player.
- Marko Bijač (born 1991), Croatian water polo player.
- Luko Biskup (born 1981), Croatian football player.
- Jozo Bogdanović (born 1960), Croatian football player.
- Mario Bonić (born 1952), Croatian football manager and player.
- Alen Bošković (born 1971), Croatian water polo player.
- Miho Bošković (born 1983), Croatian water polo player.
- Ahmet Brković (born 1974), Croatian football player.
- Danijal Brković (born 1991), Bosnian-American football player.
- Božo Broketa (1922–1985), Croatian football player.
- Andro Bušlje (born 1986), Croatian water polo player.
- Ivo Caput (born 1993), Croatian football player.
- Luka Ciganović (1915–1994), Croatian water polo player.
- Vinko Cvjetković (1911–1983), Croatian water polo player.
- Zvonimir Deranja (born 1979), Croatian football player.
- Nikša Dobud (born 1985), Croatian water polo player.
- Veselin Đuho (born 1960), Croatian water polo player and coach, Olympic gold medallist.
- Krešimir Džeba (1935–1993), Croatian and Yugoslav journalist and politician.
- Elvis Fatović (born 1971), Croatian water polo player and coach, European and world gold medallist.
- Loren Fatović (born 1996), Croatian water polo player.
- Tomislav Glumac (born 1991), Croatian football player.
- Ivo Grbić (1931–2020), Croatian artist.
- Alen Halilović (born 1996), Croatian football player.
- Zlatko Hebib (born 1990), Croatian football player.
- Mario Hezonja (born 1995), Croatian basketball player.
- Milo Hrnić (1950–2023), Croatian pop singer.
- Vladimir Ivković (1929–1992), Croatian water polo player.
- Maro Joković (born 1987), Croatian water polo player.
- Sanja Jovanović (born 1986), Croatian olympic swimmer.
- Dinko Jukić (born 1989), Croatian medley and butterfly swimmer.
- Đelo Jusić (born 1939), Croatian composer, arranger, conductor and guitarist.
- Ibrica Jusić (born 1944), Croatian musician.
- Hasan Kacić (born 1976), Croatian football player.
- Hrvoje Kačić (1932–2023), Croatian water polo player, legal scholar and politician.
- Tereza Kesovija (born 1938), Croatian singer.
- Andro Knego (born 1956), Croatian basketball player.
- Ana Konjuh (born 1997), Croatian tennis player.
- Mario Kopić (born 1965), Croatian philosopher.
- Vlatko Kovačević (born 1942), Croatian grandmaster of chess.
- Petar Kriste (born 1936), Croatian politician.
- Srđan Lakić (born 1983), Croatian football player.
- Paško Lovrić (1931–1997), Croatian cartographer.
- Marko Macan (born 1993), Croatian water polo player.
- Dario Marinović (born 1990) Croatian futsal player.
- Pavo Marković (born 1985), Croatian water polo player.
- Darko Miladin (born 1979), Croatian football player.
- Milan Milišić (1941–1991), Croatian poet and playwright.
- Mario Minatelli (1925–1990), Italian boxer.
- Bob Mirovic (born 1966), Australian boxer of Croatian descent.
- Ottavio Missoni (1921–2013), Italian-Croatian fashion designer.
- Tias Mortigjija (1913–1947), Croatian journalist, publicist, and member.
- Ivan Munitić (born 1942), Croatian handball player.
- Stijepo Njire (born 1991), Croatian football player.
- Matko Obradović (born 1991), Croatian football and goalkeeper.
- Paulo Obradović (born 1986), Croatian water polo player.
- Nina Obuljen Koržinek (born 1970), Croatian violinist and political scientist.
- Luko Paljetak (born 1943), Croatian author.
- Luka Pejović (born 1994), Croatian football player.
- Adolf Percl (1901–1951), Croatian football player.
- Hrvoje Perić (born 1985), Croatian basketball player.
- Ante Pivčević (1926–1997), Croatian sailor.
- Kristina Prkačin (born 1997), Croatian handball player.
- Nikola Prkačin (born 1975), Croatian basketball player.
- Andrija Prlainović (born 1987), Serbian water polo player.
- Branko Radović (1933–1993), Croatian basketball coach and player.
- Elvis Sarić (born 1990), Bosnian football player.
- Đuro Savinović (1950–2021), Croatian water polo player.
- Mirjana Šegrt (born 1950), Croatian freestyle and butterfly swimmer.
- Mariela Spacek (born 1974), Austrian judoka.
- Emir Spahić (born 1980), Bosnian football player.
- Mihovil Španja (born 1984), Croatian Paralympic swimmer.
- Goran Šprem (born 1979), Croatian handball player.
- Ana Sršen (born 1973), Croatian Paralympic swimmer.
- Mato Stanković (born 1970), Croatian futsal coach and player.
- Nika Stanović (born 1993), Croatian volleyball player.
- Dubravka Šuica (born 1957), Croatian politician.
- Goran Sukno (born 1959), Croatian water polo player, Olympic gold medallist.
- Sandro Sukno (born 1990), Croatian water polo player.
- Marijana Šurković (born 1984), Croatian freestyle swimmer.
- Mirko Tarana (1913–1945), Croatian water polo player.
- Mario Todorović (born 1988), Croatian swimmer.
- Slaven Tolj (born 1964), Croatian artist.
- Ante Tomić (born 1987), Croatian basketball player.
- Sonja Tomić (born 1947), Croatian writer, translator, illustrator, croatist, Germanist and radio presenter.
- Bogdan Tošović (1918–1941), Croatian water polo player.
- Petar Trifunović (1910–1980), Yugoslav chess player.
- Nikola Trojanović (1928–2019), Yugoslav swimmer.
- Frano Vićan (born 1976), Croatian water polo player.
- Tihomil Vranješ (born 1977), Croatian water polo player.
- Antun Vujić (born 1945), Croatian politician and philosopher.
- Božo Vuletić (born 1958), Croatian water polo player, Olympic gold medallist.
- Tonči Zonjić (born 1986), Croatian comic book artist.

== 21st century ==
- Karlo Sentić (born 2001), Croatian football player.
- Vicko Ševelj (born 2000), Croatian football player.

== See also ==
- List of Ragusans
