= List of people associated with the Republic of Ragusa =

Coat of arms of the Ragusan Republic

Here follows a list of notable Ragusans and Rectors of the Republic of Ragusa (also known as the Republic of Dubrovnik), a maritime republic centered on the city of Dubrovnik on the eastern coast of the Adriatic.

== Note on first and last names ==
Reflecting the dual Romance and Slavic influence on Ragusan culture, most Ragusan noble families, as well as members of the citizen class, used both Romance and Slavic versions of their first and last names, especially since the Late Middle Ages onward, while the lower classes mostly only used Slavic names. Some used only one version of their family name exclusively, e.g. the noble families Natali and Zlatarić. Since the official language of the Republic was always from the Romance language group, the official records record the last names almost exclusively in those versions, although in the older records the first names can be found in Slavic. Members of noble families, even those originally of Slavic descent, used the Slavic forms of their family names in an unofficial capacity in literary works written in Slavic, and in an official capacity only in treaties that the Ragusan State signed with its neighboring Slavic states in their language and script. In the noble class' everyday usage, most commonly the first name was in Slavic and the last name in Italian, a traditional practice which has continued until today, and transformed into official. When only the Romance version of a first or last name appears in the sources, modern Croatian and Serbian scientific literature very frequently translates it creating a new slavicized version, which often results in various errors due to insufficient knowledge of Ragusan traditions, e.g. erroneously using non-Ragusan Slavic form "Vinko" instead of Ragusan Slavic form "Vicko", or "Blaž" instead of "Vlaho", or incorrectly adapting a Romance version while ignoring actual Ragusan usage, e.g. "Natal" instead of "Božo", "Junije" instead of "Džono".

When several persons had the same first and last name, it was Ragusan custom to append the father's name in the genitive case, also changing the declension of the last name (in Ragusan the genitive case for nouns ending in -o is -a), e.g. there were two persons named Đivo Gundulić, so one was called Đivo Frana Gundulića, and the other Đivo Nika Gundulića (in modern literature this is sometimes indicated with the possessive determiner -ov, thus Franov, Nikov, translated to English as Frano's, Niko's). When translating this into Latin, the genitive case was kept, e.g. Joannes Francisci Gundulae, however, when translating into languages in which names do not have grammatical cases (such as Italian) it was written as effectively a middle name (Giovanni Francesco Gondola). It is important to differentiate this from actual middle names, such as Roger Joseph Boscovich, an example where the names were also anglicized.

Some examples of Romance and Slavic versions of last names:

Bassegli, Basilio - Basiljević
Bobali, Babalio - Bobaljević
Bona - Bunić
Bonda - Bundić
Caboga - Kabužić
Cerva, Cervinus - Crijević
Ghetaldi - Getaldić
Giorgi - Đorđić, Đurđević
Gondola - Gundulić
Gozze - Gučetić
Gradi - Gradić
Luccari - Lukarević
Menze - Menčetić
Palmotta - Palmotić
Pozza - Pucić
Resti - Rastić, Restić
Sorgo - Sorkočević
Stay - Stojković
Zamagna - Zamanja, Zamanjić

== Notable Ragusans ==
=== 14th century ===
- Franco Sacchetti (c.1335–1400) - poet and short story writer, his father was a Florentine merchant.

=== 15th century ===
- Benedetto Cotrugli (1416–1469) - merchant, humanist, scientist, diplomat
- Džore Držić (1461–1501) - poet and playwright
- Bonino De Boninis (1454–1528) - printer and publisher
- Mavro Vetranović (1482/1483-1576) - Benedictine, writer
- Šiško Menčetić (1457–1527) - poet and nobleman
- Elio Lampridio Cerva (c. 1460 - 1520) - orator, lexicographer, poet of Latin laudes,
- Paladino Gondola (fl. 1423–1472) - diplomat and merchant

=== 16th century ===
- Savino Bobali (1530–1585) - writer
- Nikola Nalješković (1505–1587) - poet, playwright and scientist
- Marin Držić (1508–1567) - playwright and poet
- Cvijeta Zuzorić (1555-c.1600) - poet
- Marino Ghetaldi (1568–1626) - scientist, mathematician and physicist
- Ivan Bunić Vučić (1591–1658) - politician and poet
- Dinko Zlatarić (1558–1613) - poet and translator
- Maria Gondola-Gozze (*1585) - poet
- Nikola Vitov Gučetić (1549–1610) - statesman, philosopher, scientist
- Ivan Gundulić (1589–1638) - writer, poet, statesman, nobleman
- Dinko Ranjina (1536–1607) - poet
- Nikša Ranjina (1494–1577) - collector of poems
- Trojan Gundulić - merchant, printer
- Mavro Orbini (mid-16th century -1614) - writer, ideologist and historian
- Luco Ghetaldi - writer
- Božo Tudisi - writer
- Niko Primi - writer
- Đulia Bona - poet
- Miho Monaldi - writer

=== 17th century ===
- Vladislav Menčetić (1600/1617- 1666) - poet
- Giorgio Baglivi (1668–1707) - physician and researcher
- Junije Palmotić (1607–1657) - writer, nobleman and dramatist
- Dživo Šiškov Gundulić (1677–1721) - nobleman, poet
- Šišmundo Gundulić (1634–1682) - politician (Rector) poet, nobleman
- Brno Ghetaldi - clergyman and historian
- Stjepan Gradić (1613–1683) - philosopher and scientist
- Frano Điva Gundulića (1630–1700) - nobleman and soldier (Austrian marshal)
- Beno Rogacci (1646–1719) - Jesuit, poet
- Ignjat Đurđević (1675–1737) - poet and translator

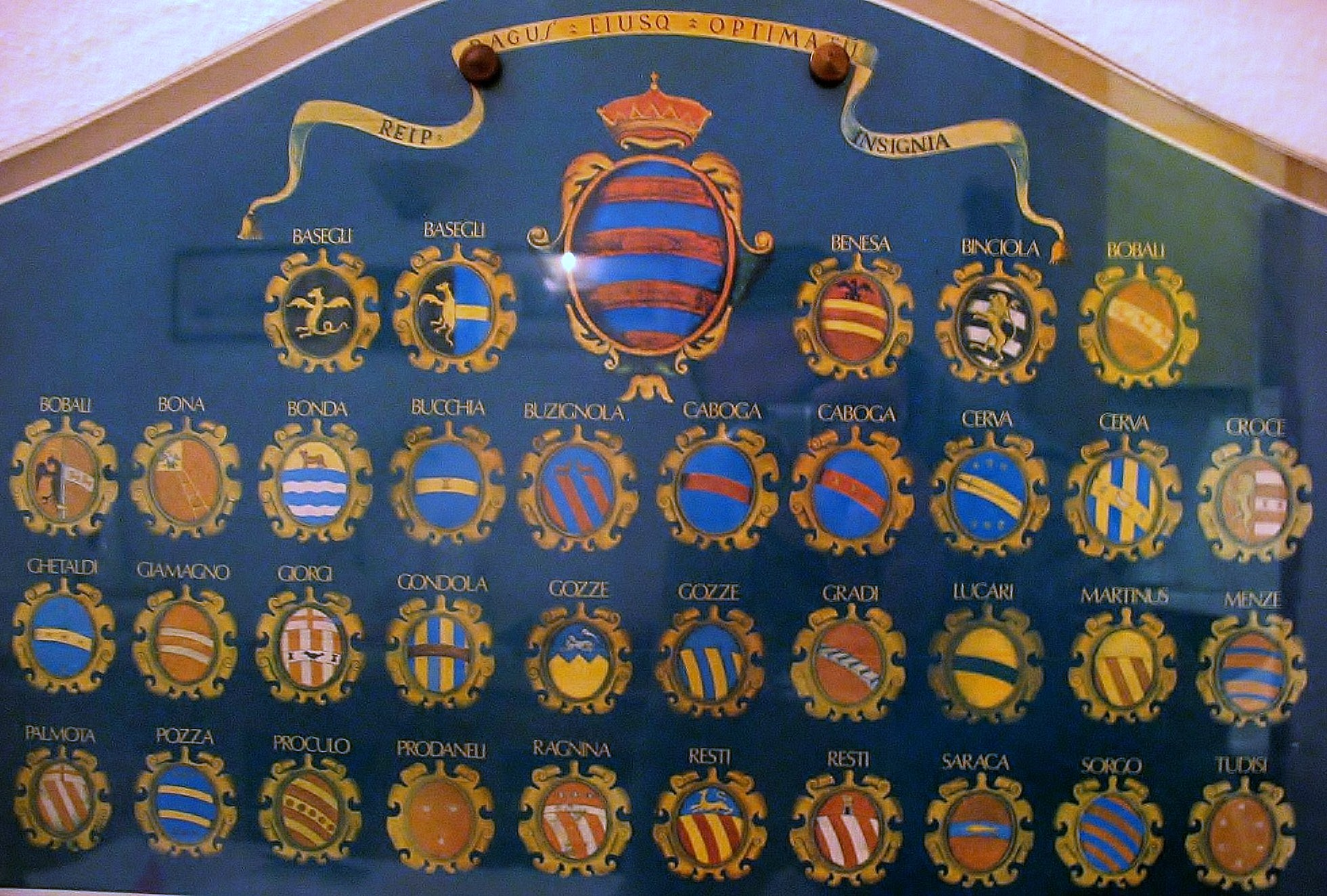
Coats of arms of the Ragusan noble families

=== 18th century ===
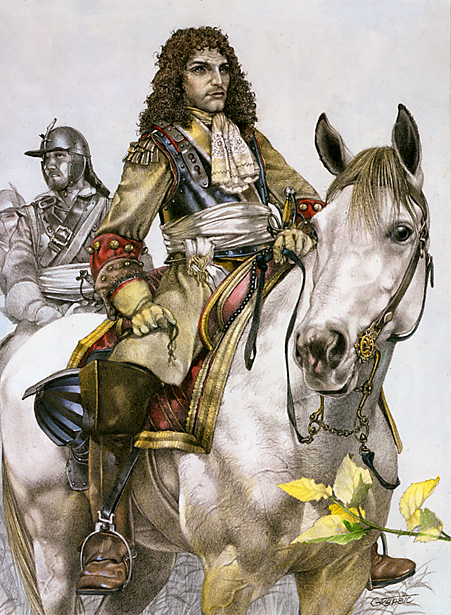
Frano Đivo Gundulić, Austrian marshal (1683), son of the famous Ragusan writer Ivan Gundulić

- Serafino Cerva (1696–1759) - historian and encyclopedist
- Sebastiano Dolci (1699–1777) - writer and Franciscan
- Đivo Frana Sorgo (1706–1771) - writer, poet
- Rajmundo Kunić (1719–1794) - writer and humanist
- Roger Joseph Boscovich (1711–1787) - physicist, astronomer, mathematician, philosopher, diplomat, poet, and Jesuit
- Đuro Ferić (1739–1820) - Jesuit, general-bicar
- Šišmundo Ghetaldi-Gondola (1795–1860) - politician, nobleman
- Vlaho Getaldić (1788–1872) - nobleman, politician, poet
- Luko Stulić (1772–1828) - scientist and physician
- Antun Kaznačić (1784–1874) - writer
- Marc Bruère (1770–1823) - writer, diplomat, dramatist and nobleman
- Jeronim Ljubibratić (1716–1779) - nobleman, soldier (Austrian marshal)
- Ivan Mane Jarnović (1740–1804) - composer
- Bernardo Zamagna (1735–1820) - theologian, Jesuit, and Dominican
- Giunio Resti (1755–1814) - politician, writer, nobleman
- Elena Pucić-Sorkočević (1786–1865) - composer
- Pijerko Franatice Sorga (1749–1826) - nobleman, writer, poet
- Antun Sorkočević (1775–1841) - diplomat, writer, composer
- Luka Sorkočević / Luca Sorgo (1734–1789) - diplomat and composer
- Benedetto Stay (1714–1801) - Jesuit and theologian
- Joakim Stulić (1730–1817) - lexicographer and linguist
- Bernardin Pavlović - Franciscan, writer
- Vito Marija Bettera-Vodopić (1771–1841) - soldier, politician, Dubrovnik patriot
- Bernhard Caboga-Cerva (1785–1855) - nobleman and soldier (Austrian marshall)

== See also ==
- Republic of Ragusa
- Dubrovnik
- List of people from Dubrovnik

== Sources ==
- Zbornik Župe dubrovačke, Author Pero Butigan, Franica Grbić, Ivo Grbić, Josipa Kerner, Ivan Bošković, Mirjana Butigan
- Heyer von Rosenfeld, Carl Georg Friedrich, Der Adel des Königreiches Dalmatien, J. Siebmacher's grosses und allgemeines Wappenbuch, Nürnberg, 1873.
- Harris, Robin (2003). Dubrovnik, A History. Saqi Books. ISBN 0-86356-332-5.
