= Getaldić (Austrian noble family) =

The Ghetaldi were an Austrian noble family that originated from the Ghetaldi family of the Republic of Ragusa.

== Genealogy ==
Elena Ghetaldi

One of the family branches originated from Matej Ghetaldi (son of Matej Ghetaldi *1682 + 1754; and Maria Pozza di Zagorien) (30 December 1705 – 13 March 1776), who married Caterina Gondola, born 12 October 1709 and died 26 December 1787. and had two sons and two daughters, Fran and Šišmundo, Uršula and Marija; Fran was later adopted by his uncle Count Šišmundo Gondola (brother of Countess Caterina Gondola) in 1787. Fran inherited his uncle and used the surname Gundulić (see Gundulić family).

- The children of Šišmundo Ghetaldi (21 February 1752, 26 December 1797), and Mariana Bosdari were:
- Vlaho Ghetaldi, who married in 1828 Ana Bosdari. They had four children:
- Šišmundo Ghetaldi (2 December 1829 – 27 January 1853 in Venice (in an accident) (Italy).
- Dživo Ghetaldi (7 January 1833 – 27 November 1916). Đivo was born in Zadar, married with Baroness Olga Collioud Ritter von Zahony, they lived in 1913 Graz, Austria. Georgischloß zu Ehrenhausen, in 1899 and adopted their daughter:
- Giulia Karola Melani Collioud-Ghetaldi (24 April 1883, Trieste – 6 July 1942, Dubrovnik); (domiciliée à San Georgen (South Tyrol) 1915) Married Ludwig Lobmeyr (1855 - 1917) in 1901, divorce soon, after that married with Rudolf Heim, k.u.k Rittm a D, (Schloß Forst bei Meran;1913)12 January (div)1909 Vienna, Austria and, the last husband was Conte Giovanni Attems di Petzenstein (Feistriz 12 July 1875 – 3 April 1942, Dubrovnik). They married 30 January 1920, Vienna, Austria. Count Attems had 3 children with Stefanie Biedermann von Turony (*Buitenzorg 3 March 1880, +Wiesbaden 23 February 1970)div; Karoline(*Degerloch 23 November 1906)(Casilla 4054, Santiago de Chile 1962), Edina(*Farra 17 August 1911, +30 July 1977) and Sigismund Douglas, Prior in Lucinico, *Farra 23 May 1914* +October 2002.
- Elena Ghetaldi (10 June 1837 in Zadar, 24 December 1931 Dubrovnik) married with Henrik Nikola Bernard Count Caboga, 1 August 1818 Dubrovnik, + 1 March 1881 Vienna, k.k Kammerers, Majors d. R. Mitgliedes des Herrenhauses MVK (KD)...), he was Austrian consul in Jerusalem. He bought in 1869 at Tantur in Bethlehem the area that was called the Tower of Jacob and Ephrata. There in 1876 the Hospice of the Order of Malta was opened. They had three children:
- Maria Bernardina Ana Kabužić 20 November 1856 Dubrovnik 19 November 1938, Trieste, married Albert Ritter Conti v. Cedassamare + 6 April 1900 Trieste, they had five children:
- Marta Marija Conti v. Cedassamare, born in Trieste 1 February 1883.
- Petar (Pedro) Marian Ritter Conti v. Cedassamare, born in Trieste 29 June 1884, died (daselbst) 6 April 1886.
- Justus (Giusto) Marijan Ritter Conti v. Cedassamare, born in Trieste 22 November 1885, died (daselbst) 26 March 1886.
- Albert Ritter Conti v. Cedassamare (also Albert Conti) (Albert Maroje Vlaho Frano Marijan) 29 January 1887, Görz, and died 18 January 1967 in Hollywood (USA), he was an actor, but first he specialized in law (high school and law college in Graz) and natural science, married Patricia Cross.
- Maria Concetta Conti v. Cedassamare, born in Pula on 5 December 1892.
- Ana Maria Enrichetta Lujza Kabužić, born 20 June 1858 and died in 1944 in Szombathely Hungary, married Lucijan v. Ziegler-Pucić in Dubrovnik 10 April 1882, born in Kotor 19 March 1852 (T.d. VizeAdmirals i. R., Eskaderkommandant (1907–08) ) died 8 September 1930 Dubrovnik, in 1913 they lived in Vienna, V.III Marxerg 2. They had three children:
- Elena v. Ziegler-Pozza, who was born in Pula 3 March 1889 and died in Baden, Viena 2 February 1968, she married Hugo Theobald Alfons Karl Maria Freiherr von Seyffertitz, (KorvKpt. i. R) who was born in Brixen 23 September 1885 and died Baden, Viena 10 June 1966. They had two sons: Herbert Seyffertitz (*1911-1939) and Hugo Seyffertitz (II)(*1927 +2007); he married with Helga Munds, they had two children; Gabriele (1957), Heribert (1959), who married with Bernadette Trauttmansdorff (*1958), they had two sons: Josef (*1996) and Michael (*1996).
- Teo v. Ziegler-Pozza, date of born unknown, died in Yugoslavia 24 November 1924, he married with Mariza v. Kiepach-Haselburg, born in Križevci, Croatia c.1897, after the death of Theo, she moves to Los Angeles and died on 27 December 1985.
- Mariza v. Ziegler-Pozza, who was born in Pula on 10 January 1885 and died in Acsád, Hungary on 2 February 1964, she married Charley Masjon, Linienschiffskapitän (1913 k u k KorvKapit K Pula), who was born in Graz 19 November 1871 and died in 1950 in Táplánszentkereszt, Hungary and they had one daughter, Winifred Masjon who was born in Pula 8 June 1911 and died in Keszthely, 14 December 1998 she married with László Harkay (Colonel) and lived in Hungary.
- Bernard Vlaho Maroje Ivan Marijan Count Caboga, Schloß Ombla b Gravosa, 21 April 1863 in Dubrovnik, 10 May 1922 and died in Waltendorf near Graz, Austria. Married with Marie Valerie Freiin v. Locatelli I Schellingg 3 T 751/4, * 4 June 1870 Angoris. He divorced her after a short period of marriage. They did not have children nor adopted any together.
- Maria Ghetaldi (23 April 1831 - 1912); they married 31 December 1852, in 1913 resided in Graz, Schumanngasse 13, had 3 children,
- Elisa Von Nadherny (unknown date of birth and death).
- Emilia Von Nadherny (unknown date of birth and death).
- Heinrich Von Nadherny (*1864 +1920). Heinrich was originally commissioned into the 3. Feldjägerbataillon around 1885/86 and served with several FJB throughout his early career. He is shown as a Kadett with seniority of 1 September 1882 in that battalion. He was promoted to Oberlieutenant on 1 May 1890 and was serving with FJB 21 in 1891. Promoted to Hauptmann on 1 November 1897 (FJB 7), he was still serving in FJB 7 in 1904. He entered the Kaiserlich-Königliche Erste Arcièrenleibgarde sometime. In 1914 he was a Titular or brevet Major still with the Kaiserlich-Königliche Erste Arcièrenleibgarde. Unfortunately the Royal Guards were not listed in the wartime editions of the k.u.k. Army Lists and so his further promotions. He married Rosa Gottel (+1923) in 1894.

== Nobility of the Austrian Empire ==
- Matteo Ghetaldi and his children: Natal, Dživo, Vlaho, Dživo, Ignjat, Matej, Marija Agata, Magdalena. Confirmation of the Italian aristocracy on 1.11.1817. (Edge number of 1686).
- Ghetaldi, Matteo, Dživo Benedikt, confirmation of the Italian aristocracy, 1.11.1817 (edge number of 1687).
- Ghetaldi, Šigismondo, Matteo, Ignazio, Biagio Dominik, of Dubrovnik, confirmation of the old aristocracy, 1817 (Edge number of 1688).
- Nikola Ghetaldi, patrician of Dubrovnik, aristocracy confirmation, Vienna 15.12.1817. (edge number of 1689).
- Dživo Ghetaldi, patrician of Dubrovnik, confirmation of the old Adles and count title, 31.5.1818. (edge number of 1690).
- Šišmundo Ghetaldi-Gondola, patrician of Dubrovnik, confirmation of the old aristocracy, 31.5.1818. (edge number of 1691).
- Šišmundo Ghetaldi-Gondola, Baron conditions 6.9.1843 (20.1.1846.) (Edge number of 2590).
- Vlaho Getaldić, Baron conditions 20.3.1847 (6.6.1848). [Edge number of 2591]. Collioud Getaldić, Giulia Karola Melani, Baron condition and coat of arms transmission of their foster father, k.u.k. treasurer, major ith R. Ivan Krstitelj Baron Ghetaldi on it 30.5. (18.12) 1893. [Edge number of 1314].

== Sources ==
- Per le nozze del signor conte Nicolò de Balbi e della signora contessa Antonija Getaldić Poesie. Ragusa: dalle stampe di Antonio Martechini, 1816.
- Caesareo principi archiduci Austriae Regio Ungariae et Bohemiae Principi etc. etc., Dalmatiam primum auspicatissime invisenti Vlaho A. Getaldić
- Jadera, Battara, 1842. In 8¡, brossura, pp. n. 24
