= Stulić =

Stulić or Štulić may refer to:

- Branimir Štulić (born 1953), Yugoslavian singer, songwriter, poet and a leader of a former rock group Azra
- Joakim Stulić (1730–1817), lexicographer from the Republic of Ragusa, author of the biggest dictionary in the older Croatian lexicography
- Luko Stulić (1772–1828), scientist from the Republic of Ragusa who first made epidemiological studies of heritable skin disorders
- Nikola Štulić (born 2001), Serbian footballer
