= Antun Sorkočević =

Croatian composer, writer and diplomat (1775–1841)

Antun Sorkočević (Italian: Antonio Sorgo, French: Antoine Sorgo; 12 December 1775 – February 1841) was a Croatian diplomat, writer, composer and member of Ragusan nobility (chevalier des odres de Saint Maurice et de Saint Lazare demeurant a Paris). He was Medo Pucić's cousin, and a good friend of Marko Bruerović. He also held the position of Mayor of Dubrovnik during the French Empire.

Sorkočević was born in Dubrovnik. His father was the composer Luka Sorkočević and mother, Paula Bondić (1743-1811). He received his initial music training from his father, and later studied music composition in Rome from 1789 to 1791. He returned to Dubrovnik where he became a member of the Great Council, the parliament of the Dubrovnik Republic, in 1794. He continued to compose in Dubrovnik. Musicologist Bojan Bujić stated, "His music often shows the limitations imposed by the provincial character of musical taste prevalent in Dubrovnik. Nevertheless, some of his works show considerable dramatic intensity." His compositional output includes the sacred work for voices and orchestra Dixit Dominus, Nell’umile mia capanna for soprano and orchestra, the art song "La preghiera" for soprano and piano, Sonata for piano and violin (1793), a symphony, a string quartet, and other chamber music works.

After 1806 led the Republic of Ragusa's diplomatic representation in Paris where he was the last ambassador of the Republic in France, where he spent 35 years of his life. In Paris he wrote Postanak i propast Republike Dubrovačke (The Rise and Fall of the Republic of Dubrovnik) in which he proposed the idea of creating a separate region comprising the Republic and Boka Kotorska under the Austrian Empire after French occupation of these lands (Illyrian provinces). The pamphlet was banned in Austria. He also put forth the idea of creating a separate region comprising the Republic and Boka Kotorska under the Austrian Empire after French occupation of these lands (Illyrian provinces).

Antun first married Catterina Schneider in 1820 in Venice. His second wife was Paola Labbia from Venice. He had one daughter, Maria (b. 1812), whose mother remains unknown.

Author of numerous publications, he became a member of Académie Celtique in 1806 and the Société des Antiquaires in 1828. Among other books he published such as Mémoire sur la langue et les moeurs des peuples slaves, Fragments sur l'histoire et la littérature de la République de Raguse et sur la langue slave, (in Croatian: Fragmenti o političkoj i književnoj povijesti stare Dubrovačke republike i o slavenskom jeziku). In 1838 he translated Ivan Gundulić's Osman into French and became the author of the earliest piano sonatas. He died in Paris in 1841.

His collection also contains abundant information relevant to the two composers' life and work (Luka i Antun Sorkočević).

== Work ==
- Fragments sur l'histoire politique et littéraire de l'ancienne république de Raguse et sur la langue slave. Paris, 1839.

== See also ==
- Republic of Ragusa
- List of notable Ragusans
- Dubrovnik
- Dalmatia
- History of Dalmatia
- Luka Sorkočević
- House of Sorkočević
