= Andrino Edesia =

Italian painter

Andrino Edesia or d'Edesia (circa 1330) was an Italian painter active in Pavia. He painted some frescoes for the church of San Martino in Pavia. He is quoted by Luigi Lanzi as a contemporary of Laodicia di Pavia, and that both likely had Greek origins.
