= Nikola Prsendic =

- Born: February 7, 1979 (age 47); Pozarevac, Serbia
- Education: Academy of Fine Art (Novi Sad, Serbia); Accademia di Belle Arti
- Known for: Painting
- Awards: 2009/2010 Primo Premio Concorso Biennale Arte e Sport

Nikola Prsendic (born February 7, 1979, in Pozarevac, Serbia) is a contemporary artist and painter, currently based in Belgrade, Serbia.

== Biography ==
Prsendic graduated in 2005 from the Academy of Fine Art in Novi Sad, Serbia. In 2008, he relocated to Rome, Italy, for a painting specialistica (equivalent to a master's degree program) at the city's renowned Accademia di Belle Arti.

In addition to his career as an independent painter, Prsendic has worked with Italian sculptor and film director Giovanni Albanese, providing creative consultation and curatorial assistance.

== Recent exhibitions ==
Prsendic's paintings have been exhibited in cities across Italy and Serbia, including, but not limited to, the following (listed in reverse chronological order):

- 2026 : 59. Hercegnovski zimski salon: (Ne)pripadanje Herceg Novi, Montenegro
- 2024 : 17. Prolećni Gradištanski likovni salon, Narodni muzej Veliko Gradište, Serbia
- 2022 : Kolektivna izložba stalne postavke povodom otvaranja galerije moderne umetnosti Golubac, Srbija
- 2020 : Zapis Kujava, online exhibition, kulturni centar "Laza Kostić" Sombor, Serbia []
- 2020 : Zapis Kujava, ULUCG Podgorica, Montenegro []
- 2019: Roma made in Serbia (Istituto Italiano di Cultura) Belgrado, Serbia
- 2019: Art without borders (Nacionalna galerija) Belgrade, Serbia
- 2018: "forest made in forest" (gallery Affiche), Milano, Italy
- 2018 Exhibition of new members of ULUS in Paviljon (Cvijeta Zuzorić) Belgrade, Serbi
- 2016: "BANG": Nacionalna Galerija (National Gallery), Belgrade, Serbia (solo)
- 2015: Nikola Prsendic, House of King Peter I Karadjordjevic, Belgrade, Serbia (solo)
- 2014: "MACADAM": Galleria l'Affiche, Milan, Italy (solo)
- 2012: A piedi scalzi, Rome, Italy (collective)
- 2011: Primaverile Romana, Associazione Romana Gallerie d’Arte Moderna, Museo Crocetti, Rome, Italy (collective)
- 2010: Nikola Prsendic, Librogalleria Al Ferro di Cavallo, Rome, Italy (solo)
- 2010: Premio Nazionale delle Arti, Accademia di Belle Arti, Naples, Italy (collective)
- 2010: Primo Premio (First prize) al Concorso Biennale Arte e Sport 2009/2010, Auditorium Parco della Musica, Rome, Italy
- 2008: Nikola Prsendic, Galeria Dom Omladine, Kragujevac, Serbia (solo)
- 2007: Third Summer Exhibition, Galerija Narodne Biblioteke “Vuk Karadzic”, Veliko Gradiste, Serbia (solo)
- 2006: Second Summer Exhibition, Galerija Narodne Biblioteke “Vuk Karadzic”, Veliko Gradiste, Serbia (solo)
- 2005: Izlozba crteza studenata cetvrte godine akademije umetnosti Novi Sad, galeria ART KLINIK, Novi Sad, Serbia (collective)
