= Benedetto Stay =

- Born: 1714; Ragusa (Dubrovnik), Republic of Ragusa (now Croatia)
- Died: 1801 (aged 86–87); Rome, Papal States (today's Italy)
- Occupation: churchman

Benedetto Stay (1714–1801) was a Ragusan Roman Catholic clergyman, educated by Jesuits, he attended the academic assemblies of Marin Sorgo, beginning the composition of a poem on Alexander Farnese. Later on, he published "Saggio sull'uomo", based on the system of Descartes.

== Life ==
Stay came from the Stay family from Antivari (Bar) (now Montenegro). His grandfather, after whom he was named, was a painter. At the age of 28, he journeyed to Rome and became the pupil of Silvio Valenti Gonzaga at the Sapienza University of Rome. Pope Clement XIII conferred on him the position of secretary of Latin letters and Clement XIV named him Head of the Secretariat. He died on 25 February 1801.

== Works ==
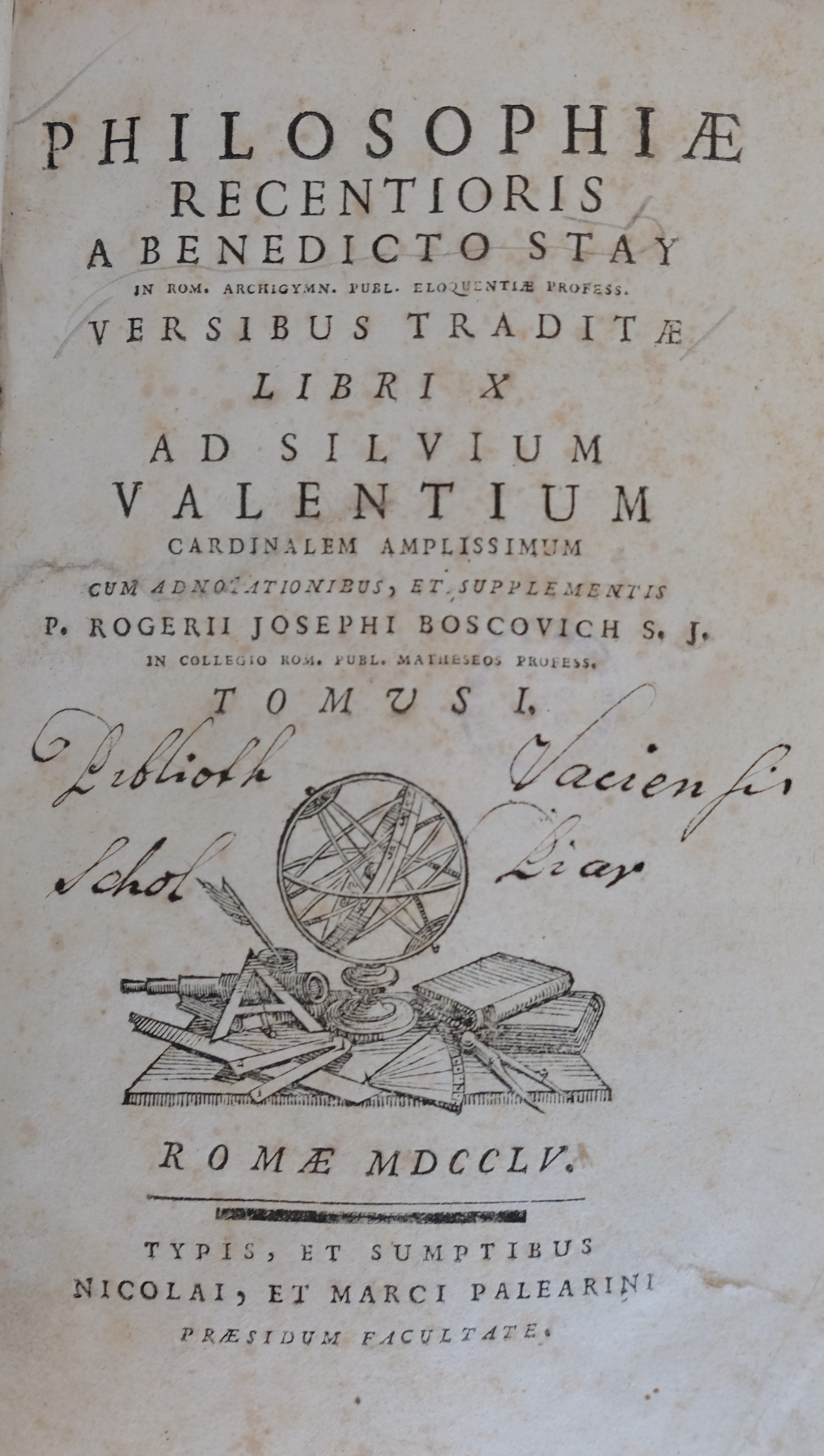
Title page of a 1755 copy of "Philosophiae recentioris a Benedicto Stay versibus traditae libri x"

He was the author of two Latin poems, one on the Cartesian philosophy in 6 books (Venice 1744) and the other on that of Newton in 10 books (1755–1792). Besides, he wrote three orations: one on the death of Clement XII, one for the election of his successor, and the third on the death of August III, king of Poland.

== Bibliography ==
- Giovanni De Bizzarro (1802). In morte di Benedetto Stay insigne filosofo e poeta ode libera. Venezia.
- Francesco Maria Appendini, Notizie istorico-critiche sulle antichità, storia e letteratura dei Ragusei, Ragusa 1802;
- Niccolò Tommaseo, Studi critici, Venezia 1843;
- Simeone Gliubich, Dizionario biografico degli uomini illustri della Dalmazia, Vienna 1856;
- Milivoj Šrepel, Stay prema Lukreciju (Stay in relazione a Lucrezio) in Rad, Zagabria 1895;
- Attilio Tamaro, La Vénétie Julienne et la Dalmatie, Roma 1919;
- Ildebrando Tacconi, I poemi filosofici latini di Benedetto Stay il Lucrezio Ragusino, in La Rivista dalmatica, 1934 e 1935.
- Benedetto Stay (1747). Philosophiae a Benedicto Stay,... versibus traditae libri sex di Benedetto Stay. ex typogr. Palladis.
