= Marc Bruère =

Ragusan writer

Marc Bruère Desrivaux/des Rivaux (Croatian: Marko Bruerović; 1770 in Lyon – 1823 in Cyprus) was a Ragusan writer and dramatist of French origin.

== Life ==
Son of the French consul to Republic of Ragusa René Bruere-Desrivaux (1736–1817). He arrived very young in Ragusa (Dubrovnik) to attend local studies with a native teacher (a Jesuit Đuro Ferić) and in company of the children of the local notables he spent his entire life in Bosnia and Dalmatia.

The first small book Marko wrote (“Per le nozze de N.S. Nicolo Sorgo colla nobil Dama Comtessa Elena Sorgo”) dates from 1789 and was written in Italian. He also wrote comedies, satirical poems and astrology studies. The main writings of Bruerović were published by the magazines Dubrovnik (in 1852) and Slovinac (in 1878) in Croatian.

In 1793 he was engaged for 4 years in diplomatic work in Travnik (Bosnia and Herzegovina) as merchant attaché, where he also helped the Jewish merchants (based in Sarajevo). He and his wife Katarina Hodić, a Bosnian Croat, had two children. Later after the death of his wife, he remarried with Mara Kisić.

== See also ==
- List of notable Ragusans
