= Luigi Lanzi =

Italian art historian and archaeologist (1732–1810)

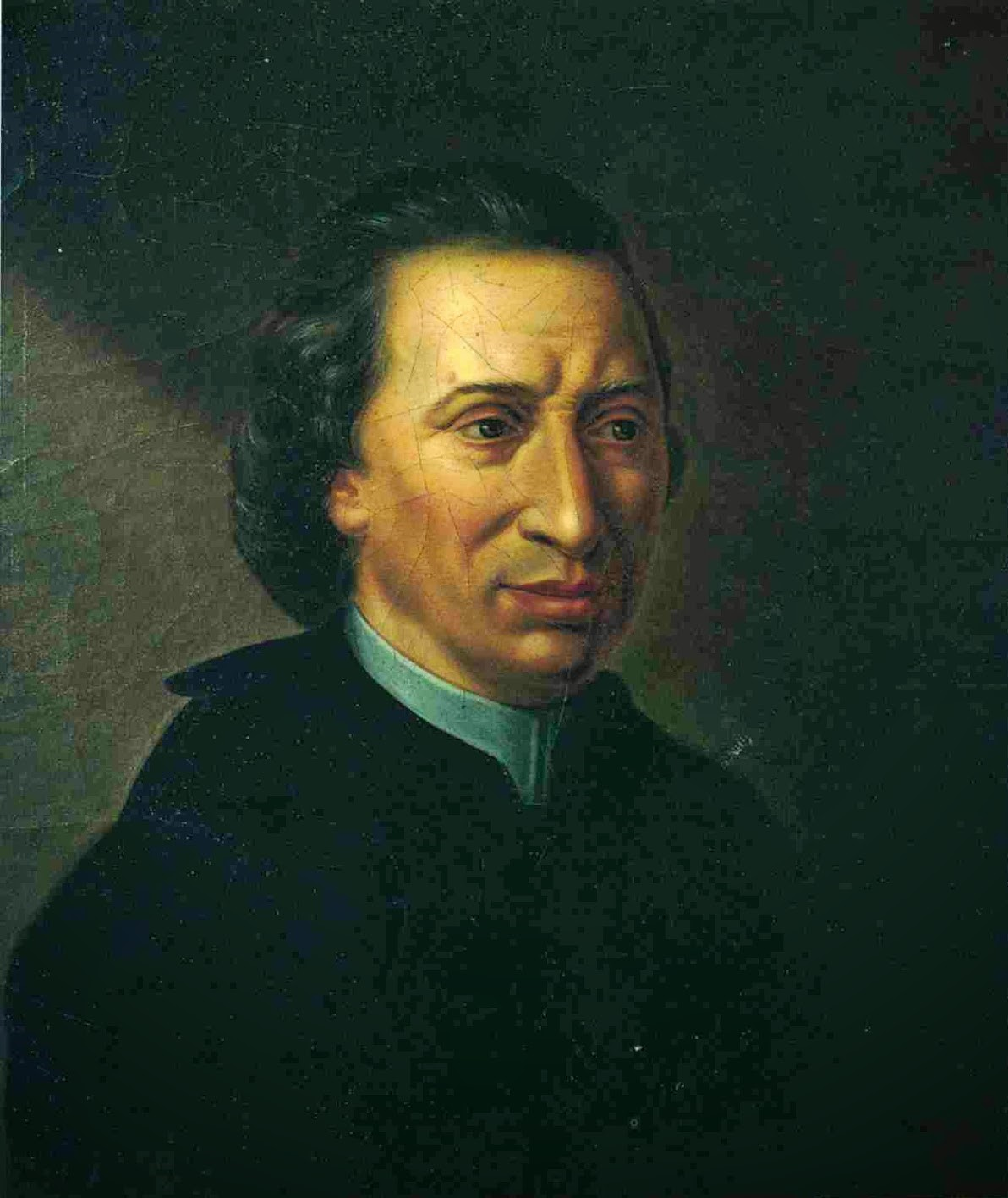
- Anonymous portrait of Lanzi from between 1775 and 1799
- Born: 13 June 1732; Treia, Papal States
- Died: 31 March 1810 (aged 77); Florence, French Empire
- Burial place: Santa Croce, Florence
- Occupations: Archaeologist; Art historian; Museum curator
- Parent(s): Gaetano Lanzi and Bartolomea Lanzi (née Firmani)

Academic background
- Education: Roman College
- Academic advisor: Rajmundo Kunić

Academic work
- Institutions: Uffizi
- Main interests: Italian art; Etruscan language

Signature
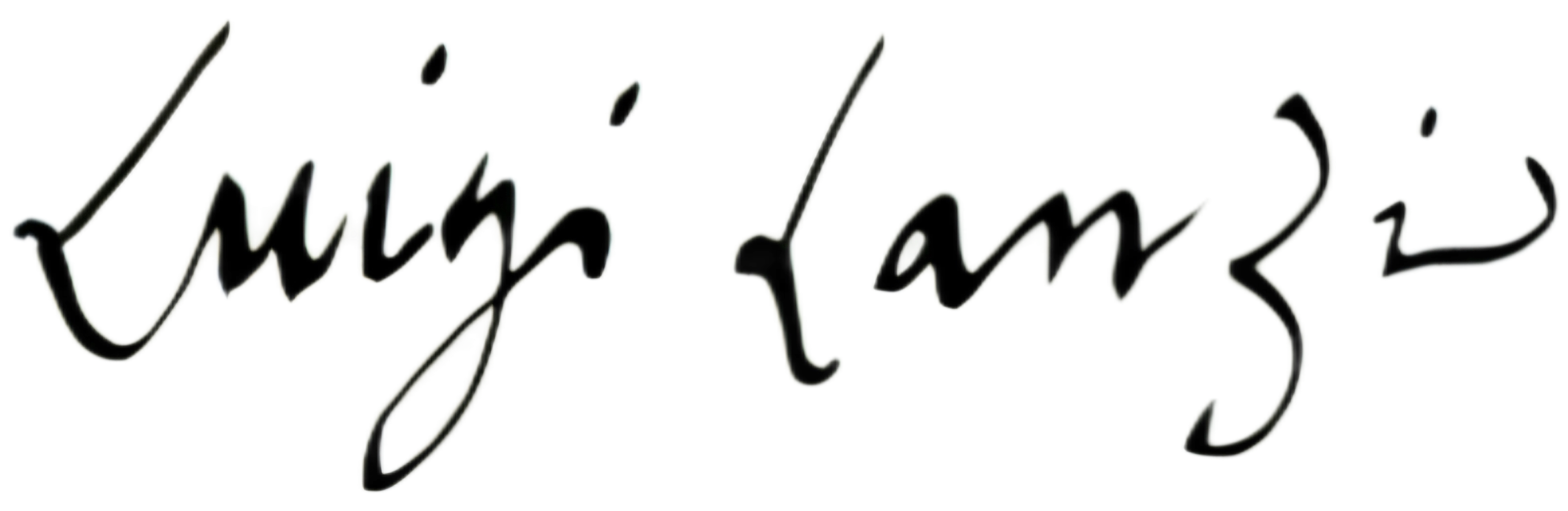

Luigi Antonio Lanzi SJ (13 June 1732 – 31 March 1810) was an Italian Jesuit priest, known for his writings as an art historian and archaeologist. When he died, he was buried in the church of the Santa Croce at Florence by the side of Michelangelo.

== Biography ==
Lanzi was born in the central Italian town of Treia in the Papal States on 13 June 1732. He attended Jesuit schools in Fermo and Rome before joining the Jesuit Order in 1749. While in Rome, he taught classical literature in Jesuit schools, concurrently absorbing the Neoclassical theories of Johann Joachim Winckelmann and Anton Raphael Mengs.

When the Jesuit Order was suppressed in 1773, he was in Siena, where he had been sent for health reasons. In 1775, Grand Duke Leopold of Tuscany appointed him keeper of the galleries of Florence, where he also became president of the Accademia della Crusca. He thereafter studied Italian painting and Etruscan antiquities and language. In the one field, his labours are represented by his Storia Pittorica dell'Italia, the first portion of which, containing the Florentine, Sienese, Roman and Neapolitan schools, appeared in 1792, the rest in 1796.

In archaeology, his great achievement was Saggio di lingua Etrusca (1789), followed by Saggio delle lingue d' Italia in 1806. In his 1806 memoir on the so-called Etruscan vases Dei vasi antichi dipinti volgarmente chiamati Etruschi, Lanzi rightly perceived their Greek origin and characters. What was true of the antiquities would be true also, he argued, of the Etruscan language, and the object of the Saggio di lingua Etrusca was to prove that this language must be related to that of the neighbouring peoples: Romans, Umbrians, Oscans and Greeks.

He was allied with Ennio Quirino Visconti in his great but never accomplished plan of illustrating antiquity altogether from existing literature and monuments. His notices of ancient sculpture and its various styles appeared as an appendix to the Saggio di lingua Etrusca, and arose out of his minute study of the treasures then added to the Florentine collection from the Villa Medici. The abuse he met with from later writers on the Etruscan language led Corssen to protest in the name of his real services to philology and archaeology.

Among his other productions was an edition of Hesiod's Works and Days, with valuable notes, and a translation in terza rima. Begun in 1785, it was recast and completed in 1808. The list of his works closes with his Opere sacre, a series of treatises on spiritual subjects.

== Works ==
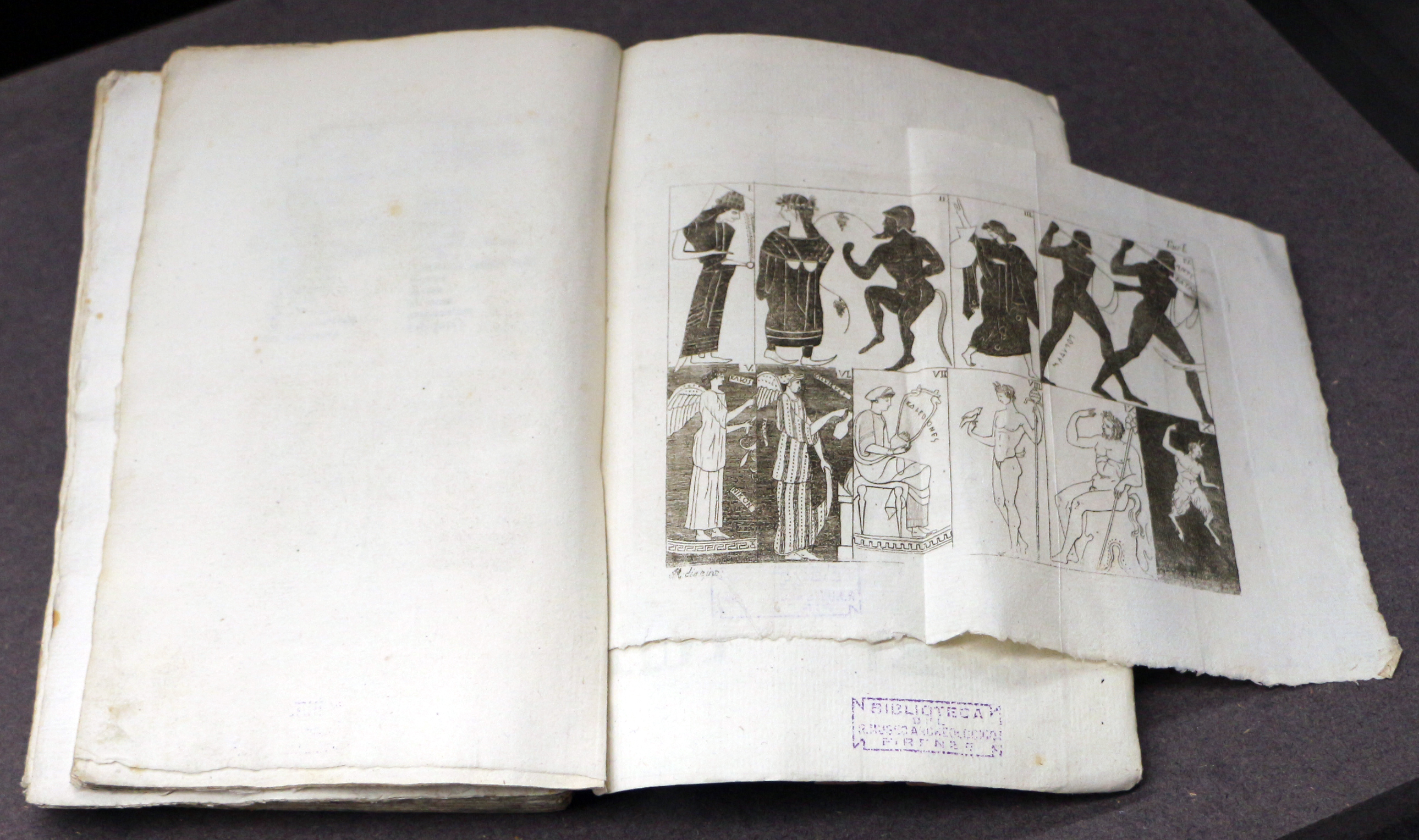
De' vasi antichi dipinti, volgarmente chiamati etruschi (1806)

- Saggio di lingua etrusca, e di altre antiche d’Italia, per servire alla storia de’ popoli, delle lingue et delle arti, Rome, 1789, 3 vols.
- De’ vasi antichi dipinti, chiamati etruschi, dissertazioni tre. Opuscoli raccolti da accademici italiani relativi a Storia antiquaria e lingue antiche che servono ad illustrarle, Florence, 1806.
- Illustrazioni di due vasi fittili ed altri monumenti recentemente trovati in Pesto, comunicate all'Inclita Accademia Italiana di Scienze Lettere ed Arti, Rome, 1809.
- (1809) Storia pittorica della Italia dal risorgimento delle belle arti fino presso al fine del XVIII secolo; English translation: The History of Painting in Italy, From the Period of the Revival of the Fine Arts to the End of the Eighteenth Century (1828), by Thomas Roscoe:
  - Vol. I, Schools of Florence and Siena
  - Vol. II, Schools of Rome and Naples
  - Vol. III, School of Venice
  - Vol. IV, Schools of Lombardy
  - Vol. V, Schools of Bologna, Ferrara, Genoa, and Piedmont
  - Vol. VI, Indexes
- Di Esiodo Ascreo i Lavori e le Giornate, opera con 4 codici riscontrata, emendata, la versione latina, aggiuntavi l’italiana in terze rime, con annotazioni, Florence, 1808.
- Opere postume dell’abate D. Luigi Lanzi, Florence, 1817, 2 vols.

== Bibliography ==
- Boni, Onofrio (1816). Elogio dell'abate L. Lanzi (in Italian). Pisa: Niccolò Capurro.
- This article incorporates text from a publication now in the public domain: Gilman, D. C.; Peck, H. T.; Colby, F. M., eds. (1905). "Lanzi, Luigi". New International Encyclopedia (1st ed.). New York: Dodd, Mead.
- Natali, Giulio (1911). "Nel primo centenario dalla morte di Luigi Lanzi". Atti e Memorie di Regia Deputazione di Storia patria per le province delle Marche. VI. Ancona: 103–125.
- This article incorporates text from a publication now in the public domain: Chisholm, Hugh, ed. (1911). "Lanzi, Luigi". Encyclopædia Britannica. Vol. 16 (11th ed.). Cambridge University Press. p. 188.
- Natali, Giulio (1933). "LANZI, Luigi". Enciclopedia Italiana (in Italian). Rome: Istituto dell'Enciclopedia Italiana.
- Bernabei, Franco (2003). "Lanzi, Luigi". Grove Art Online. Oxford University Press.
- Anna Santucci; Fabrizio Capanni, eds. (2010). L'abate Luigi Antonio Lanzi tra filologia classica e letteratura religiosa. Corridonia: Simple. ISBN 978-8862593151.
