= Sorgo family =

Noble family of the Republic of Ragusa

Sorgo
- Noble family
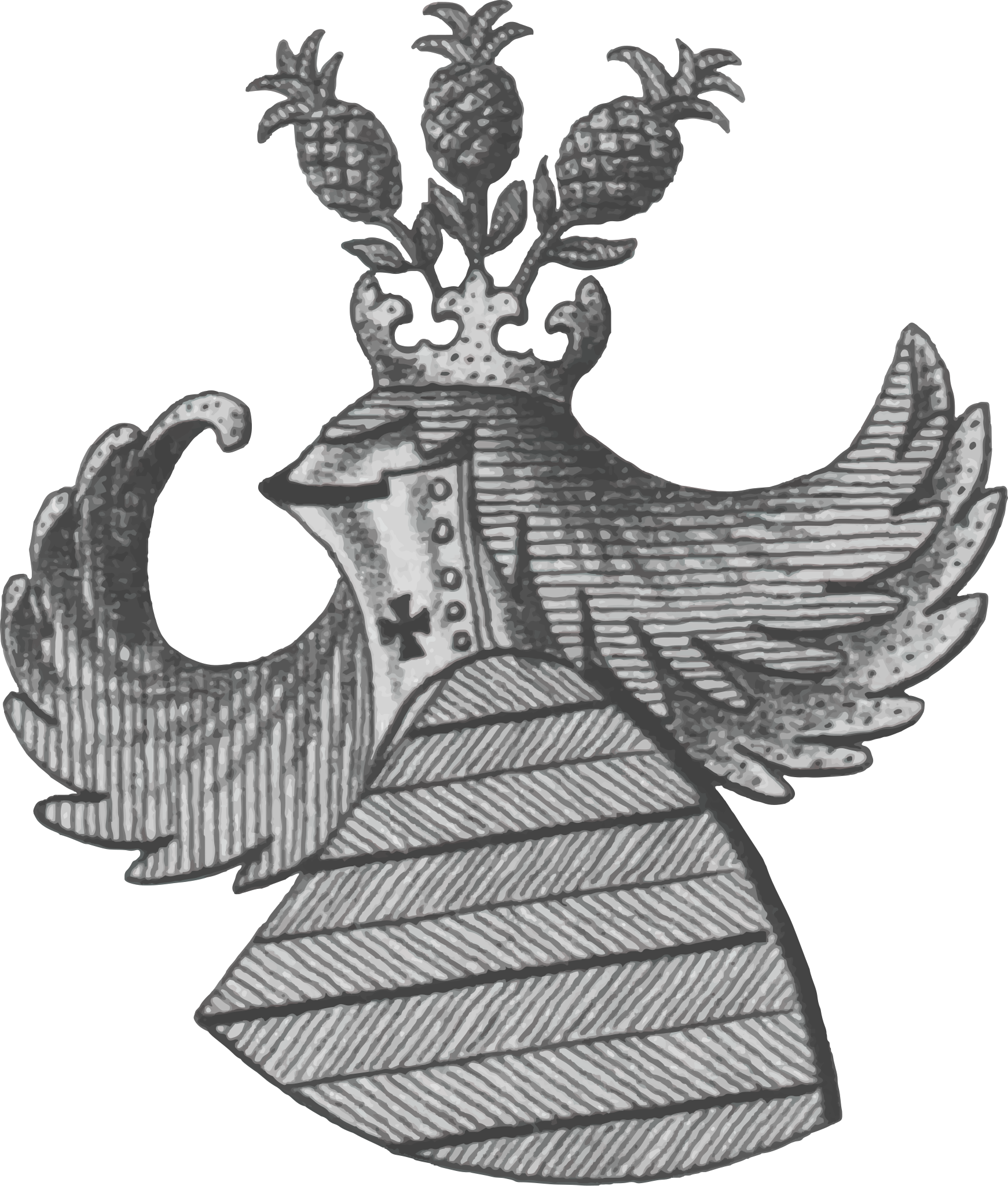
- Coat of arms of the Sorgo as depicted in Friedrich Heyer von Rosenfeld's "Wappenbuch des Königreichs Dalmatien", published in 1873.
- Country: Republic of Ragusa
- Current region: Kotor
- Origin: Albania
- Founded: 1272
- Dissolution: 19th century

The House of Sorgo (in Italian) or Sorkočević (in Croatian) was the name of a noble family of the Republic of Ragusa.

== Name ==
Known as de Sorgo, Surgo, Sorco and Surco in Italian, their name is derived from sorghum.

== History ==
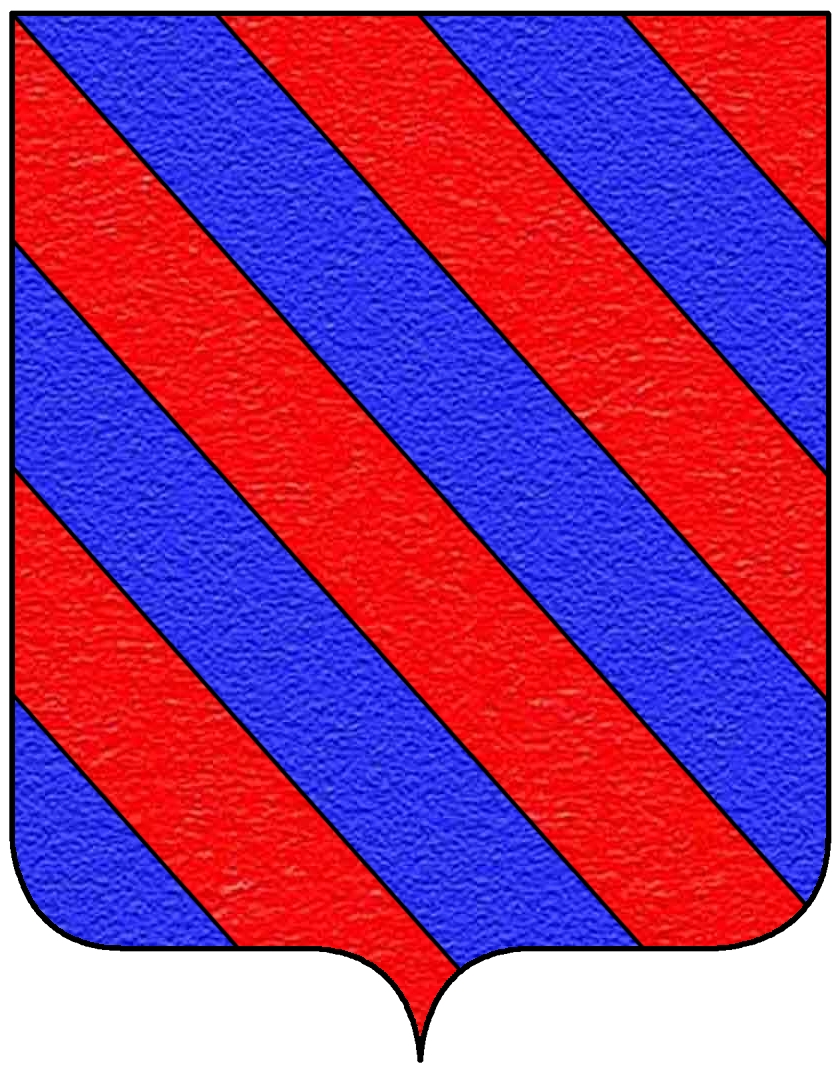
Coats of arms of the Sorgo

According to the Annals, the Sorgo was a grain-trading and ship-owning family who immigrated from Albania via Kotor in 1272, and were ennobled in 1292 after bringing sorghum during a famine. They hailed from the Cape of Rodon (di Redoni d' Albania antichi), according to a later entry in the Annals. However, "Vita de Dobroslavo", the progenitor, is mentioned in 1253, and died before 1281. Vita had seven sons and two daughters. He had a son, Dobrosclavus, who was mentioned between 1274 and 1283, when he died.

In 1527, Vlaho Sorgo, a patrician in Venice, recruited Jacobus Rizo as a doctor against the plague.

== Genealogy (Austrian branch) ==
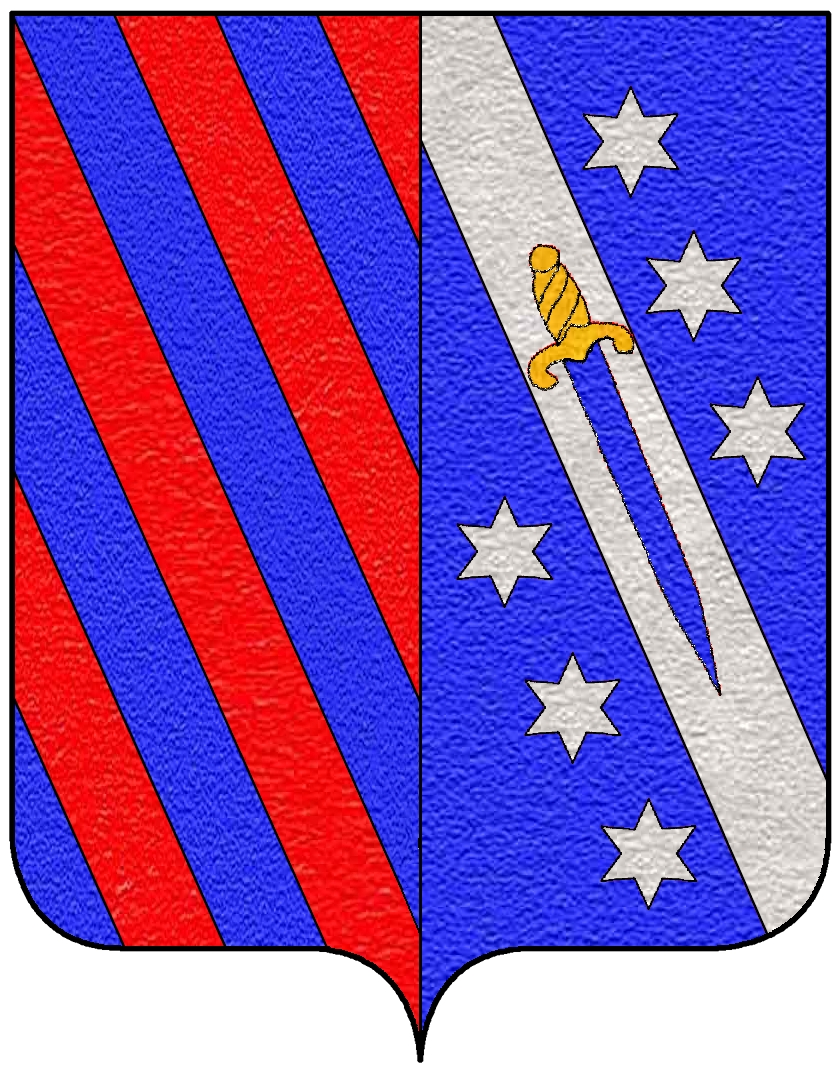
Coat of arms of the Sorgo-Cerva

- Niccolo I Sorgo (born in April 1709), son of Giovanni Sorgo (1664–1736) and Maria Gradi). Married Maria Resti. Their sons were:
  - (1) Nikola Marijan Sorgo (born 16 August 1759)
  - (2) Šišmundo Alojz Sorgo (born 24 December 1763), which both ones 1 December 1817 have been recognized. was married later with Magdalena Countess Pucić von Zagorie, their offspring were:
    - (a) Marina Marija Antonija Alojzija Sorgo (born 13 September 1795), married Lucijan Đivo Dominko Vincenc Pucić (born 20 August 1780). They had two children:
      - Matej Lucijan and Marija Dominka (3 August 1820 – 21 April 1866). Marija Dominka married Wenzel Ritter von Ziegler (11 October 1810, Graz – 4 September 1896, Trieste, ), k.k Lanadesgeriches. She had two children:
        - Matej von Zigler-Pucić, date of birth and death unknown.
        - Lucijan von Ziegler-Pucić (19 March 1852, Kotor – 28 September 1930), T.d. VizeAdmirals i. R., Eskaderkommandant between 1907. Married with Ana Marija Enriketa Countess Kabudžić (born 20 June 1858, date of death unknown) in Dubrovnik on 10 April 1882. They had three children:
          - Helena von Ziegler-Pucić (3 March 1889, Pula – 2 February 1968, Vienna), married Hugo Theobald Alfons Karl Maria Freiherr von Seyffertitz (23 September 1885, Brixen – 10 June 1966, Vienna), KorvKpt. i. R.
          - Teo von Ziegler-Pucić (date of birth unknown, died in Yugoslavia on 24 November 1924), married Marica von Kiepach-Haselburg, born in Križevci, Croatia c. 1897. After the death of her husband, she moved to Los Angeles and died in 1985.
          - Marica von Ziegler-Pucić, date of birth and death is unknown, she married Charley Masjon, Linienschiffskapitän. They had one daughter:
            - Winifred Masjon (8 June 1911 – 14 December 1998), married Laszló Harkay in Hungary.
    - (b) Tereza Gaetana Alojzija (born 24 May 1797)
    - (c) Đivo Jeronim Alojzije Anđelo (born 3 October 1799)
    - (d) Lucijan (born 7 June 1802)
- Petar Marijan Sorkoćević, son of Đivo Vlahov (born 8 May 1746), married Uršula Menčetić. His nobility was recognized by the Austrian Empire on 1 December 1817. Remarried Marija Božidarević. Their sons were:
  - Petar Ignac Nikola (born 25 June 1793)
  - Vlaho Dominik (born 18 April 1797)
- Nikola Vladislav Sorkočević (1717–1790), married Helena Zamanjić, daughter of Matej Martolica Zamanjić (born 1635), on 31 August 1760. Their aristocratic status was recognized by the Austrian Empire on 1 November 1817. The sons of Nikola Vladislav and Helena were:
  - (1) Vladislav (born 15 December 1761), married Nikola Gučetić, daughter of Nikola Gućetić. They had four children:
    - (a) Helena Marija (born 27 February 1793), married Natale de Saracca. They had four children:
      - Paola
      - Paolo
      - Vladislao
      - Orsato Maria Domenico de Saracca (30 December 1832 – 20 October 1890), married Rosa Cecotti. They had eight children:
        - Rafael
        - Helena
        - Nikola
        - Maksim
        - Magdalena
        - Antun
        - Natal Saraka (30 September 1866, Split – 19 January 1945, Roncaiette), married Giuseppina Bucchich (2 June 1867 – 3 July 1952).
    - (b) Ana Marija Elizabet (born 3 June 1794)
    - (c) Nikola Frano (born 2 April 1796)
    - (d) Nikola Marijan Vlaho (born 25 May 1797)
  - (2) Matej Baltazar (born 6 January 1763), married Magdalena Bunić, daughter of Nikola Đivo Bunić, and had six children:
    - (a) Nikola Stanislav (born 19 November 1791)
    - (b) Vladislav Ignjat (born 13 December 1795)
    - (c) Luko Ksaver (born 13 July 1797)
    - (d) Đivo Frano Marijan (born 25 March 1799)
    - (e) Marin Dominik Frano (born 28 February 1804)
    - (f) Paula (born 4 September 1807)
  - (3) Marin Paskal (17 May 1767 – 1842), married Helena Gučetić, daughter of Melkior Gučetić. They had three children:
    - (a) Nikola Antun (born 3 May 1803)
    - (b) Melkior (born 1 April 1808)
    - (c) Antun (born 20 July 1810)
- Luko Jure Sorkočević, son of Frano. Aristocratic status recognized on 10 November 1817.
- Ana, daughter of Frano Jeronim Bunić, widow of Petar Sorkočević

Also, the following descent is known as well:

- Antun Sorkočević (born 5 July 1727), married Lucija Bunić whose father Marius Medo was married to Marija, daughter of Luko Džono Sorkočević.
  - His son Luko Božidar Frano (born 12 November 1776), married with Nikolada Gučetić, Melkior's daughter. They had children:
    - Antun Đivo (born 30 August 1812), from the nobles Sorkočević-Crijević
- Petar Ignjat (1746–1826) died in Dubrovnik without descendants. On 10 November 1817 in Graz, his aristocracy was acknowledged.

== The Mirošević-Sorkočević family ==
In 1904 the Natali family became extinct which left the second daughter as the eldest living descendant in direct descent with the name Maria Natali. She was already married to the Dubrovnik Port Captain and mariner, Hermann von Mirošević. They had 3 children. By Imperial decree from Franz Joseph I, on 5 January 1905, it was decreed that henceforth the family shall be known as von Mirošević-Sorgo:

- Hermann Niko von Mirošević-Sorgo (1859-1923); married Maria Ana Luigina Natali (1862-1929)
  - Nikola Mirošević-Sorgo (1885 died September 1966), ambassador to the Vatican for the Kingdom of Yugoslavia during WWII. Minister in Exile of the Yugoslav cabinet. Son of Hermann von Mirošević-Sorgo, eldest son in direct descent and head of the Sorkočević family, posthumously a published poet. Survived by his wife Dobrila Mirošević-Sorgo, née Jefremović (1889–1982). They had sons:
    - Branko (1924–present)
    - Ivan (1926–1991), he had children:
      - Nikki (1954–present)
      - Mara (1955–present)
      - Marko (1957–present)
        - His children:
          - Petra (1999–present)
          - Christian (2002–present)
      - Vladimir (1959–present)
        - His children:
          - Niko (1995–present)
          - Andreja (2001–present)
      - Andrej (1961–2000)
    - Poznań (1931–2022)
      - His children:
        - Antun (1968–present)
        - Isabelle (1971–present)

== Notable members ==
- Paskoje Sorkočević (fl. 1419–50, died 1454) was a Ragusan nobleman, diplomat, judge and merchant.
- Antun Sorkočević (1775–1841), the last ambassador of the Republic in France, where he spent 35 years, authoring numerous publications.
- Luka Sorkočević (1734–1789), whose symphonies are performed throughout the world, lived in Dubrovnik. His two sisters were the first female composers in Croatia.
- Nikola (Niko) Sorkočević, wrote an important book about navigation, shipbuilding, and tides, published in 1574.

== Gallery ==
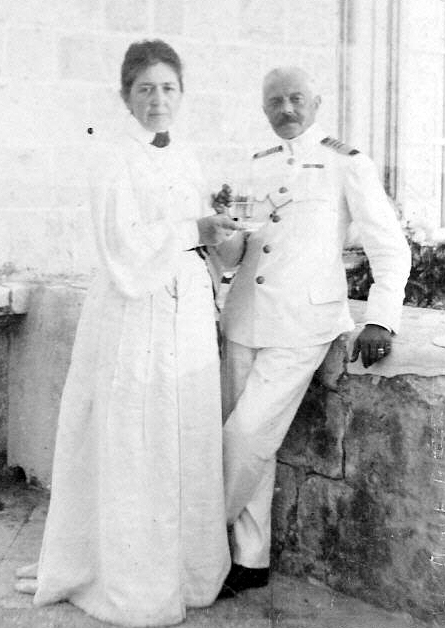
Ana Kabudžić and Lucijan von Ziegler-Pucić

Helena Ziegler-Pucić

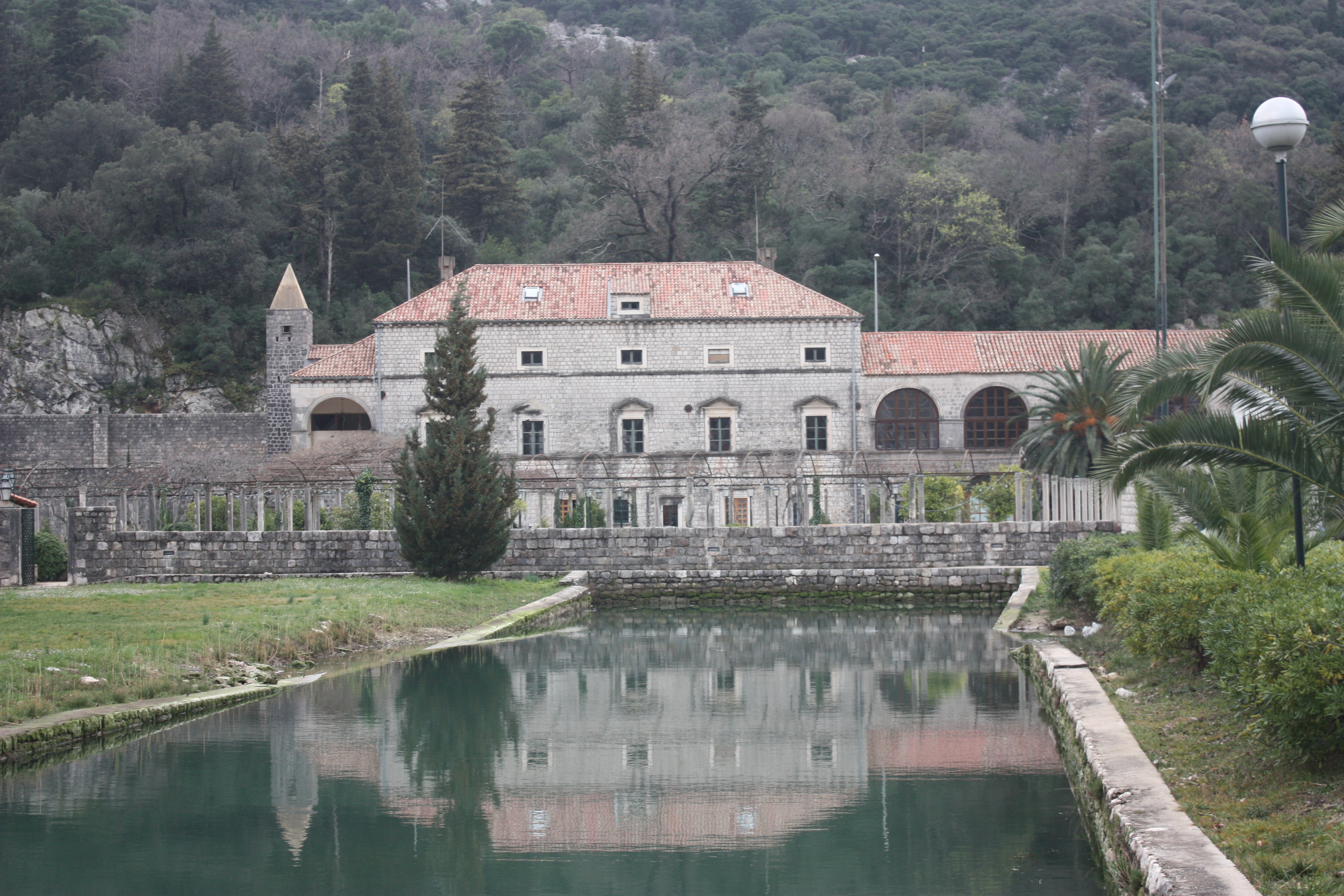
Sorkočević palace in Dubrovnik

== See also ==
- Republic of Ragusa
- Dubrovnik
- Dalmatia
- Post-Roman patriciates

== Sources ==
- Siebmacher "Dalmatien" Seite 21 f., Tfl. 14
- Hermann Von Mirošević-Sorkočević, Hafen- u SeeSanKapit = Dubrovnik, Königreich Dalmatien, High-Life-Almanach: Adressbuch der Gesellschaft Wiens und der österreichischen Kronländer, 1913 (pg. 386)
