= Francesco Maria Appendini =

Francesco Maria Appendini (November 4, 1768 – 1837) was an Italian Latin and Italian scholar who studied Slavic languages in the Republic of Ragusa. The French invasion prevented him from returning to Italy, and he adopted Republic of Ragusa as his own country. He took it upon himself to investigate its history and antiquities.

== Early life ==
Appendini was born at Poirino, near Turin, in 1768. Poirino was then part of the Kingdom of Piedmont-Sardinia. He received his early education in his native country, after which he went to Rome, where he entered the order of the Scolopj or Scholarum. The order (Christian Brotherhood) devoted itself to the education of students working as teachers in the colleges and schools of Italy and neighbouring countries.

Having done his theological studies, Appendini moved to Ragusa (Dubrovnik), where he was appointed a professor of rhetoric in the college of the Scolopj.

== Literary works ==
After several years of consulting the old documents and chronicles and the traditions of the region. He published in 1803, his "Notizie Istorico-Critiche Sulla Antichita, Storia, e Letteratura de' Ragusei" (published in two vols.) which is dedicated to the senate. It is considered by some to be his best work on the Republic of Ragusa which was for centuries like an advanced post of civilisation and which maintained its independence against the neighbouring Slavs, Ottomans and the Republic of Venice. Its flag was respected all over the Mediterranean, and the Republic preserved the regions traditions and cultivated the arts of Europe. It was situated on a narrow strip of land in Southern Dalmatia, now in modern Croatia. Its disappearance from the list of independent states was hardly noticed in the midst of the revolutionary events which had swept away most of the old republics of Europe.

In Appendini's first work he also investigates the history and antiquities of the Epidaurum or Epidaurus, the parent of Ragusa, which was destroyed by the Slavs in the 7th century. He enters into discussions concerning the ancient inhabitants of the Roman Province of Dalmatia, their language and religion, the migrations of Thracians and Greeks to the coast of the Adriatic, and the wars of the Illyrians with the Roman Empire. He describes the site of Epidaurum and the extent of its territory, and presents several Roman inscriptions found among its ruins, near Cavtat. The sepulchre of P. Cornelius Dolabella, who was consul under Augustus and governor of Illyricum, and the remains of an aqueduct which were all in the same neighbourhood. Appendini then proceeds to account for the origins of modern Ragusa/Dubrovnik, who were refugees from Epidaurum and from Salona.

The maritime part of Dalmatia continued to be called Roman Dalmatia, and remained subject, to the Byzantine Empire. Dubrovnik, however, governed itself as an aristocratic republic. Manuel Comnenus in 1170 gave to the city the rights of citizens of Constantinople. The Latin language, although modified (Dalmatian language), continued to be spoken in Dubrovnik till the 13th century, when it was gradually superseded by the Slavs. The senate however decreed that the Latin should continue to be the language of administration, and in order to keep on the study of it, they created and instituted a chair of Latin. There it is described in separate chapters, its form of government, its church (attached to the Latin communion), its laws, customs, its relations with the Republic of Venice and with the Slavic principalities of Croatia and Bosnia, its policy towards the Ottomans and its commerce.

The merchant navy of Republic of Ragusa engaged in of the trade between the Levant and the ports of Europe. They traded also with Spain and with England. The name of Argosies given by writers of the Middle Ages to large vessels that carried rich cargoes, which were from Dubrovnik. In the sixteenth century the Ragusan's had three hundred vessels in the Spanish navy. These vessels were lost in the expeditions of Tunis, Algiers and others, under Charles V. and Philip II. These losses and the earthquake of 1667 which destroyed the greater part of Dubrovnik, were the causes of the decay of its maritime trade, which however recovered to a certain extent during the eighteenth century.

== Second volume of Appendini's work ==
The second volume of Appendini's work looks at the literature of Republic of Ragusa. The author gives attention to the local writers who have written in Italian (or Latin), and those who have written in the vernacular Slavic-Croatian.

Among the historians are:

- Meletius, who wrote in the 12th century in Latin verse concerning the history of Epidaurum and of Ragusa.
- Ludovico Cerva or Cervano, surnamed Tuberone, who wrote on the history of the Turks, "De Turcarum Origine, Moribus et Rebus gestis Commentarius", Florence 1590.
- Matthias Flaccus Illyricus, who went to Germany, and become a Lutheran. He was one of the main compilers of the "Centuriae Magdeburgensis"
- Luccari, who wrote in Italian the Annals of Ragusa till the end of the 16th century.
- Mauro Orbini, author of a history of the Slavic principalities established in Roman Dalmatia and other parts of Europe during the Middle Ages.
- Eusebio Caboga, who wrote in Latin the "Annals of Republic of Ragusa'' and the lives of its bishops.
- Giunio Resti, who wrote history of the Republic in Italian.
- Benedetto Orsinich, author of a genealogical history of the Komnenos dynasty.
- Anselmo Banduri, the author of the " Imperium Orientale".
- Sebastiano Dolci, a Franciscan, who wrote "De Illyricae Linguae Vetustate et Amplitudine," Venice 1754 and "I Fasti Letterarii- Ragusei," Venice 1767 and also a commentary on the life and works of Saint Jerome, printed at Ancona in 1750.

Amongst other residence of Dubrovnik were the physician Baglivi; the mathematician Roger Joseph Boscovich; several members of the family of Stay (Stojic), Raimondo Cunich, the author of many Latin poems and for a long time a professor in the Gregorian college at Rome; Bernardo Zamagna, who translated into Latin the Odyssey, Hesiod, Theocritus, and Moschus; Cardinal Giovanni Stoiko, who was sent as legate to the council of Basle; Simone Benessa, a jurist, the author of a book on the practice of the courts of Ragusa and Benedetto Cotrugli, who was employed in several important offices of state, such as the Kingdom of Naples. He wrote a work on the profession of commerce and the duties of a merchant, "Della mercatura e del mercante perfetto" (Book on the Art of Trade), published in Venice in 1573.

Lastly, the Second volume gives a list of poets who wrote in the Slavic languages. Ivan Gundulic (Giovanni di Francesco Gondola) was amongst them. He also notices several Slavic poets of other parts of Dalmatia and of Bosnia and Montenegro, their Popevke (ballads). Appendini's book contains one of the most complete views of the Republic as it was before its military occupation by the French in 1806.

== French rule of the Republic of Ragusa ==
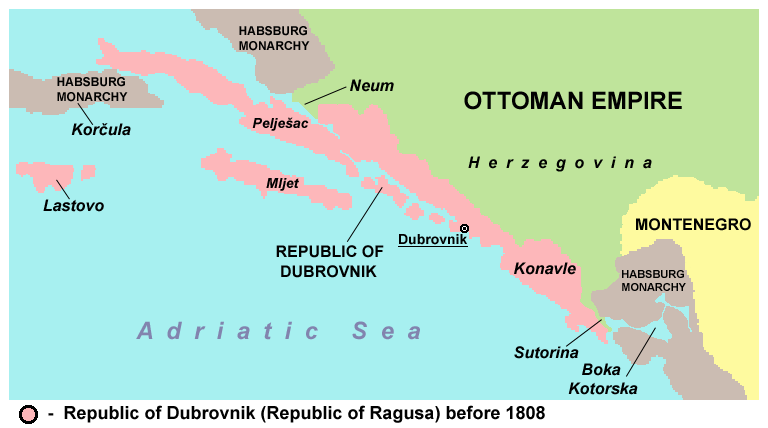
The Republic of Ragusa before 1808

After the French had taken military possession of the Republic in 1806 and annexed the country to the Illyrian Provinces, which were governed by Marmont, one of Napoleon's generals. Appendini prevailed upon the new government to retain the order of the Scolopj, and entrust to it the instruction of youth in the districts of the former Republic and of Kotor (Cattaro). He was appointed rector of the new college of Dubrovnik, and sought assistants from Rome.

His own brother, Urbano Appendini, was made professor of mathematics. In 1808 Appendini published a grammar of the "Illyrian" language, written on the basis of the written Shtokavian literature and existing lexicographical works. In 1810 he wrote " De Praestantia et Venustate Linguae Illyricae" and another on the analogy between the languages of the ancient nations of Asia Minor and the languages of the Thracians and Illyrians. Both these are prefixed to the " Dictionary of the Illyric Language" of Father Gioacchino Stulli of Ragusa. He also undertook a work entitled " Il Varrone Illirico," on the etymology of the Illyric language, tending to show the derivation of the ancient names of the principal rivers, mountains, and other localities of Europe from Illyric radicals, but he did not live to complete the work. He also wrote biographies of noble men of Kotor (Cattaro).

When the Austrian government recovered possession of Dalmatia in 1815, and with it of the town and territory of Republic, which had been incorporated with that province by Napoleon, Appendini was commissioned to establish a central institution at Zadar (Zara), for the purpose of creating teachers for the different educational institutes of the Dalmatia Province. He and his brother Urbano set to work but they experienced numerous obstacles to their plan. They went to Vienna in order to secure the support of the Austrian Emperor Francis I and his ministers, which they obtained and the school for teachers at Zadar was maintained.

Appendini latter returned to his home in Dubrovnik. His brother remained at the head of the school in Zadar, where he died in 1834, upon which Appendini returned to Zadar to fill his brother's place. He died of apoplexy in January, 1837. He was buried with great respect, his funeral being attended by the magistrates and nobility of Zadar. A biographical of him was published in Dubrovnik by one of his former students, the advocate Antonio Casnacich.

Additional works:

- Memoria Sulla Vita e gli Scritti di Gio. Ragusa in 1837. There he gives an appraisal of Ivan Gundulic's epic poem the Osman the subject of which is the war between Sultan Othman II and the Poles in 1622, in which the Turks were defeated, soon after which the Sultan was deposed and strangled by the Janizaries, it being the first instance of a Turkish Sultan put to death by his subjects.

Appendini work on the history and literature of Republic of Ragusa that gives extracts of the Slavic text of the poem with Italian and Latin versions of the same:

- Translation in Croatian of the Austrian civil code.
- Several funeral orations and other minor works.
- De Vita et Scriptis Bernards Zamagna. Zara, 1830.
- La Vita el Esame Delle Opere del Petrarca
- Esame Critico Sulla Quistione Intorno alla Patria di S. Girolamo. Zara, 1835.

== See also ==
- Kingdom of Piedmont-Sardinia
- Republic of Ragusa
- Dubrovnik
- Dalmatia
