= Paskoje Sorkočević =

Russian politician and nobleman

Paskoje Sorkočević or Pasko Junijev Sorkočević (Latin: Paschalis (de) Sorgo/Pascoe de Sorgo; fl. 1419/50 – 1454) was a Ragusan nobleman, diplomat, judge and merchant from Dubrovnik, the Republic of Ragusa. He was a member of the Sorkočević noble family.

He served in the medieval Kingdom of Bosnia as a consul in Srebrenica. He served also at the court of the Serbian Despotate under Đurađ Branković (r. 1427–56) as čelnik and diplomat. He was the most famous of the Ragusan nobility that served at the Serbian Despotate court. In 1419, Sorkočević was present at Pristina. He and Damjan Đurđević lived and traded for years in the Serbian Despotate prior to entering the service of Despot Đurađ. They acquired possessions in Serbia and became real feudal lords. In the period of 1423–30 he was chosen each year as Ragusan consul or judge. In Despot Đurađ's service, Damnjan Đurđević and Paskoje Sorkočević participated in marches against the Ottomans, and were entrusted with most important of missions in Hungary and with the Ottoman sultan. In 1445, he was present at the mining town of Novo Brdo.

In 1447, he served as a Ragusan judge. All negotiations between Despot Đurađ and John Hunyady were since 1448 were led by Paskoje Sorkočević and other that Despot Đurađ had chosen. In 1450, he is mentioned as collecting a debt in Ragusa for the despot.

Mavro Orbini claimed that Despot Đurađ liked Paskoje so much that he put up the Sorgo coat of arms at the Smederevo Fortress, still visible in Orbini's time (1614).

== Sources ==
- Desanka Kovačević-Kojić (2007). Gradski život u Srbiji i Bosni (XIV-XV vijek): The Urban Life in Serbia and Bosnia (XIV-XV Century). Istorijski institut. pp. 273–. ISBN 978-86-7743-059-7.
- Историјски часопис: орган Историјског института Српске академије наука и уметности. Научно дело. 1975.
- Историјски часопис 3 (1951-1952). Istorijski institut. 1 September 1953. pp. 126–. GGKEY:73HS377YS6Y.
- Despot Đurađ Branković: gospodar srbima, podunavlju i zetskom primorju. Štampano u Državnoj štampariji. 1880.
- Miloš Blagojević (2001). Državna uprava u srpskim srednjovekovnim zemljama. Službeni list SRJ. ISBN 978-86-355-0497-1.
