= Nikola Vitov Gučetić =

Ragusan statesman, polymath, philosopher, science writer and author

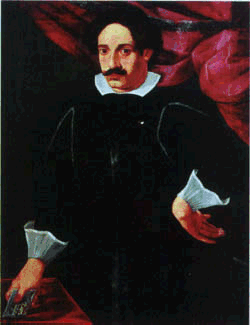
Nikola Vitov Gučetić.

Nikola Vitov Gučetić (Italian: Nicolò Vito di Gozzi, Latin: Nicolai Viti Gozzii; 1549–1610) was a Ragusan statesman, polymath, philosopher, science writer and author of one of the first scientific dissertations regarding speleology.

== Life ==
Gučetić was born in Ragusa (now Dubrovnik, Croatia), into the Gučetić (Gozze) noble family, being kin of the earlier writer Đivo Gučetić (1451–1502). He received most of his education in Dubrovnik and Italy. He was the central person in the cultural life in Dubrovnik in his time and owned probably the biggest private library in town.

Rarely traveling outside the limits of town, he was occupied by trade, finances, and other official duties for the city-state. Elected Rector of the Republic of Ragusa seven times at the turn of the 17th century, he devoted his life to the prosperity of the city.

Pope Clement VIII awarded him an honorary doctorate in philosophy as well as master's degree in theology. Gozze was highly regarded for his works related to philosophy, politics, sociology, and pedagogy.

Gučetić married Marija Gundulić-Gučetić, who was a philosopher too, and wrote La querelle des femmes u renesansnom Dubrovniku. The dedication written in her husband's book Discorsi di m. Nicolò; Vito di Gozze sopra le metheore d'Aristotile. Ridotti in dialogo e divisi in quatro giornate under the title "Alla non men bella, che virtuosa e gentil donna Fiore Zuzori in Ragugia" Venetiis, 1582, is an extraordinary discourse in Ragusan heritage, given in the first place in the defence of the authors' friend Cvijeta Zuzorić ("Fiore Zuzori") but also the other women. Marija was uncompromisingly critical towards the Dubrovnik society that attacked her friend. Her criticism was so sharp that censorship was imposed on it. Marija's dedication has a theoretical value as well because it constitutes a part of a huge debate on the worth of women led in Europe from the 14th century on. The article puts her text in the context of this debate.

== Works ==
Gučetić wrote in the Italian and Latin:

- Commentaria in sermonem Auer. De substantia orbis, et in propositiones de causis 1580
- Dialogo d'amore detto Antos, secondo la mente di Platone 1581
- Dialogo della Bellezza detto Antos, secondo la mente di Platone 1581
- Sopra le Metheore d' Aristotile ("About Aristotle's meteors"), first in 1584 and in 1585 the second edition, in Venice.
  - This work is a comment on explanations of natural phenomena according to the principles of natural philosophy given by Aristotle.
- Dello stato delle republiche secondo la mente di Aristotele 1591
- Discorsi della penitenza 1589
- Governo della famiglia 1589

== On winds and caves ==
In a part of the book "About Aristotle's meteors" relating to the meteorology which discuss the phenomenon of wind, the writer mentions two caves noted to generate very strong winds at their entrances:

- Šipun cave near Cavtat in the Dubrovnik area
- An unnamed cave in Popovo polje in Herzegovina – most probably today's Vjetrenica cave (vjetar=wind)

Based on these observations, Gučetić explained the origin of winds in general and winds in some caves by the process of evaporation of the Earth's elements which is caused by the Sun. Being warm, dryer and denser, the evaporation medium is unable to penetrate the Earth through its surface, but only through the large openings and that is what produces wind. Gučetić noted that wind cannot be observed deeper inside the cave, but only at the entrance. He explained that by the acceleration of the air current in narrower passages, similar to that one of the sea current in narrow sea passages.

In the case of a windless šipun cave, Gučetić stated that this phenomenon is not universal for all caves. He explained the absence of wind on its entrance by its higher humidity and presence of a lake in one or more of possible passages. According to his opinion, the bigger amount of water is favorable for the growth of stygobites and troglobites which are abundant in the šipun cave.

== See also ==
- List of notable Ragusans
- History of Dalmatia
