= Đuro Ferić =

Đuro Ferić, also Giorgio Ferrich, (May 5, 1739 – 1820) was a poet and a Jesuit vicar general of the Republic of Ragusa.

As a poet, he belonged to the Illyrian circle in Ragusa (now Dubrovnik, Croatia). Illyrian (Slavic) was synonymous with the Croatian language at that time. His Latin-language collection of Illyrian fables, published in Ragusa in 1794, bore the title Fabulae ab Illyricis adagiis disumptae, and a second similar text, existing only in manuscript, was titled: Adagia illirycae linguae fabulis explicata. An unpublished collection of his own Slavic poems was titled in Latin: Slavica Poematia Latine reddita.

In the second decade of the 19th century, he published in Ragusa two further works in Croatian (Slovinski). Ferić put together a collection of short poems in praise of those Ragusan poets who wrote in the Illyrian language, such as Dominko Zlatarić's translation of Sophocles and Ivan Gundulić's Osman.

== See also ==
- Republic of Ragusa

== Sources ==
- Ferić, Đuro (in Croatian)
