= Luka Sorkočević =

Luka Sorkočević

Count Luka Sorkočević (Italian: Luca Sorgo; January 13, 1734 – September 11, 1789) was a composer from the Republic of Ragusa. His music has been preserved, like other Sorkočević family possessions, in the archives of the Dubrovnik Franciscan convent. He is known as the first Croatian symphonist.

== Biography ==
Luka (Lukša) Sorkočević was born in Dubrovnik and received an extensive education. His music teacher was the Italian composer Giuseppe Valentini, who was maestro di cappella of Dubrovnik Cathedral in the 1750s. He continued his education in Rome where he studied musical composition with Rinaldo di Capua. Later, Sorkočević married a girl from the Luccari (Lukarević) family and held several posts in various branches of Dubrovnik politics and society. During his relatively brief stint in Vienna as the ambassador to the imperial court he met several leading composers of his time, like Gluck and Haydn, and the famous poet Metastasio – a valuable experience for his later life and work. With serious health problems, he committed suicide by throwing himself from the third floor of his palace in Dubrovnik in 1789, at the age of 55.

Although he also wrote a few vocal pieces, his most interesting works are the eight symphonies, the violin sonata and the overture trio for the flute. These instrumental works belong to the transitional period between baroque and classicism. They can neither be associated with the empfindsamer Stil – indicated by the fact that they are exclusively written in major keys – nor with the modernism of the Mannheim school. Nevertheless, Sorkočević's music contains traces of both styles. The Largo of the Symphony No. 7 shows the kind of expression which is associated with the Empfindsamkeit and the first movement of the Symphony No. 1 contains the crescendi for which the Mannheim school was famous. The Sonata in A-major for piano was written in 1754.

== See also ==
- Republic of Ragusa
- List of notable Ragusans
- Dubrovnik
- Dalmatia
- History of Dalmatia
- Antun Sorkočević
- House of Sorkočević

== External sources ==
- Biography in the Croatian Encyclopedia
- Sorkočević and his instrumental works
- Biography (in Croatian)
- Sorkočević's music review
- Samples of Sorkočević's music
