= Bernardo Zamagna =

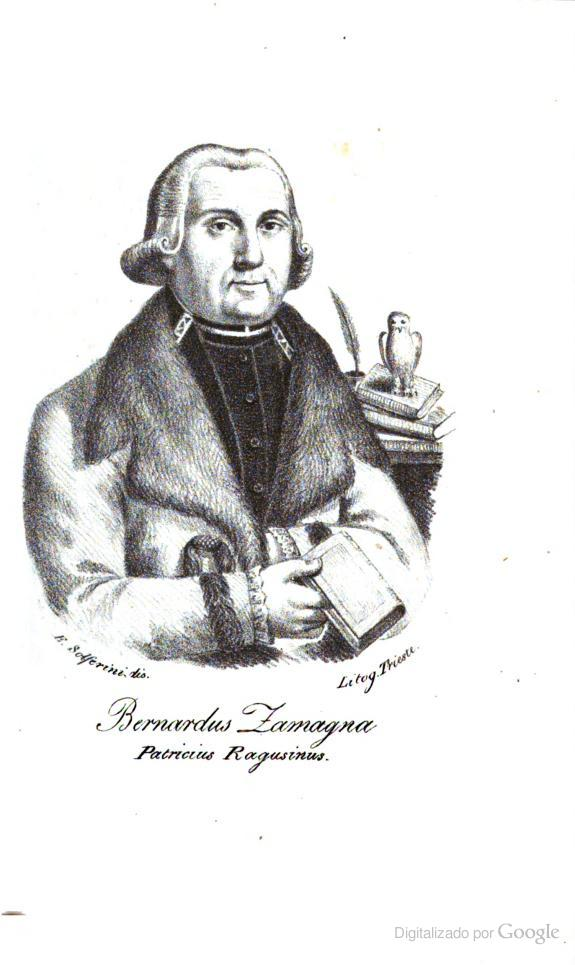
Bernard Zamanja

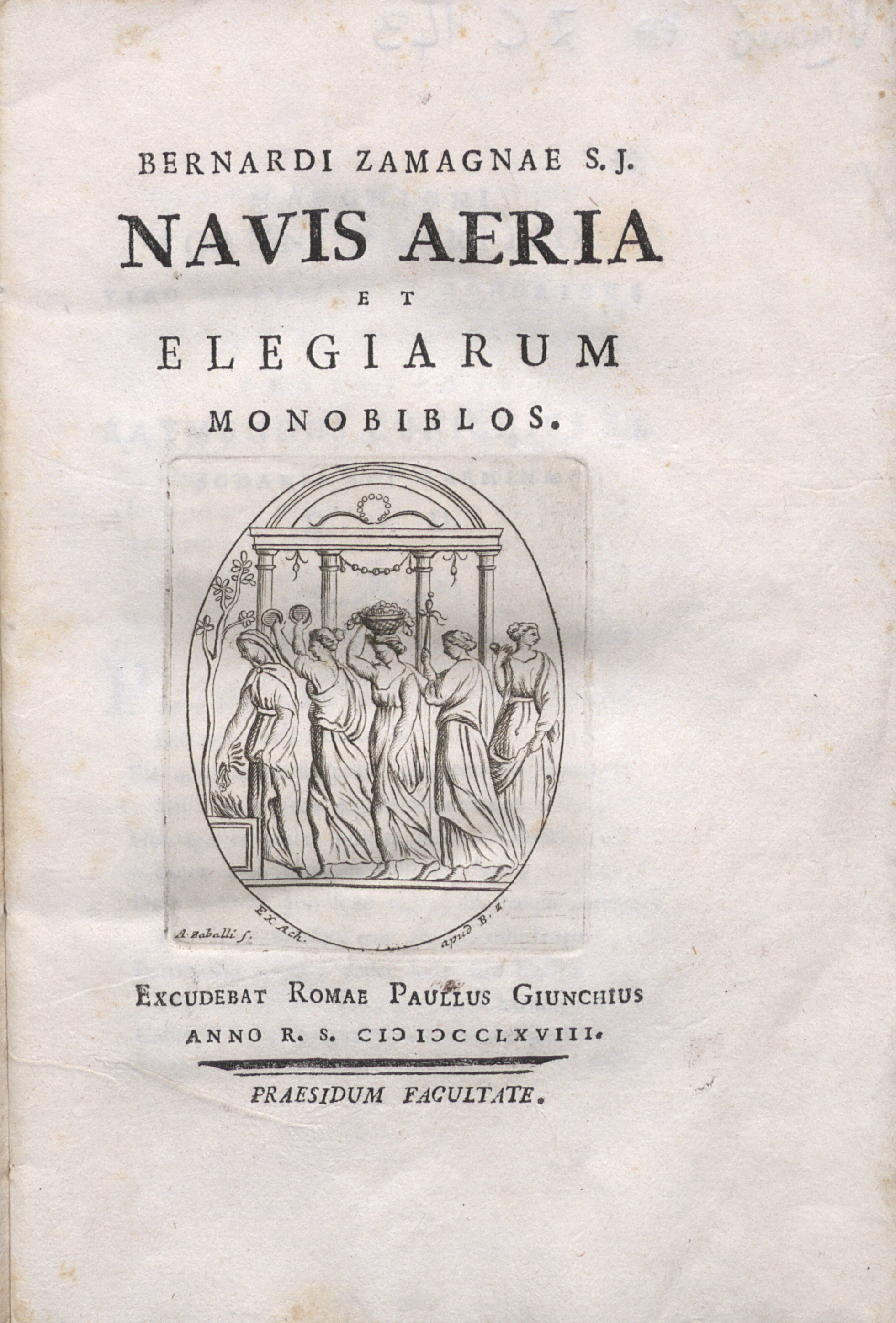
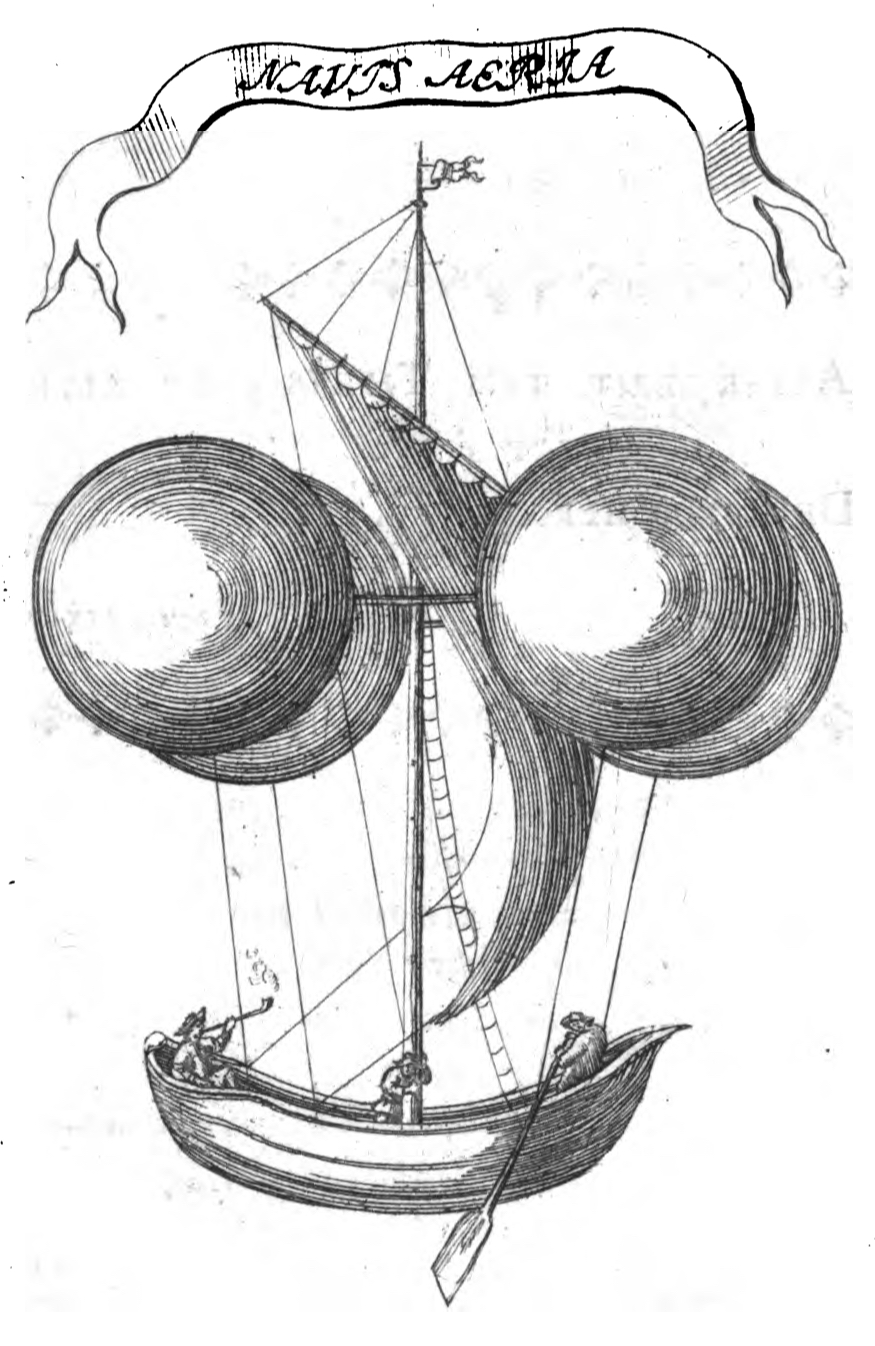
In his epic Navis aeria ("Airship", 1768), Zamanja wrote of an airship suspended by four balloons.

Bernardo Zamagna (Croatian: Bernard/Brno Zamanja; 9 November 1735 – 20 April 1820) was a Dalmatian Italian priest, poet and translator. He wrote in Latin.

Bernardo was born in the Ragusa (present day Dubrovnik) in 1735. He was the son of Marco Zamagna (who died two months before his birth) and Maria Caboga. He was educated by Jesuits. In 1753, he moved to Rome to continue his studies and began his novitiate at S Andrea al Quirinale. After two years he took his first monastic vows. His teachers were Ragusans Raimondo Cunich and Roger Boscovich. After the conclusion of his studies in Rome, he went to live in Siena.

Poet and scientist with a passion for astronomy, at twenty years only he published a poem in Latin: De aucupio accipitris (The Hunting of the Sparrowhawk). This work was soon republished in Germany. Later, he translated into Latin the Odyssey (Venice, 1777) ("Homeri Odyssea Latinis Versibus Expressa"), this edition was dedicated in a long letter of Latin Hexameters to the grand Duke Pietro Leopold of Tuscany, to whose court Zamagna seems to have been sent by the Senate of Ragusa.

He wrote commentaries on Hesiod and Theocritus (Parma 1768), Catullus, Tibullus and Propertius. He refused the chair of Greek at the University of Milan, offered by Maria Theresa of Austria and returned in Ragusa in 1783. He died on 20 April 1820, aged 84.

== Works ==
- —— (1768). Navis aeria (in Latin). Roma: Paolo Giunchi.

== Bibliography ==
- Ciampaglia, Giuseppe: "La Navis Aeria di padre Bernardo Zamagna". Strenna dei Romanisti del 2007. Casa Editrice RomaAmor, Roma 2007
