= Luko Stulić =

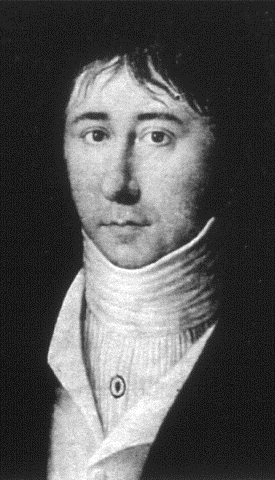
Luko Stulić.

Luca Stulli, also Luko Stulić, (1772–1828) was a scientist from the Republic of Ragusa (Republic of Dubrovnik) in today's southern Croatia who first made epidemiological studies of heritable skin disorders. His treatise of what became the Mljet disease (after the Adriatic island of Mljet) is a classic in dermatological literature.

He began studying medicine at the University of Bologna in 1792, graduating in 1795. From there he travelled to Florence and then to Naples, where he worked under the doctors Cotunnio and Cirillo.

== See also ==
- Republic of Ragusa
- List of notable Ragusans
- Dubrovnik
- Dalmatia
- History of Dalmatia
