= Sebastiano Dolci =

Ragusan writer

Sebastiano Dolci (Croatian: Sebastijan Dolci-Slade; 1699-1777) was a Ragusan historian and writer. The Italian word Dolci means "sweet", and Slade is a Croatian translation of the name. He joined the Franciscans at the age of 14, and in 1744 wrote about the Franciscan Order in Ragusa. In 1750, he published a biography of Saint Jerome.

Dolci was a great scholar of the Illyrian language, publishing several books on the subject, including an overview of the literature of his native Dubrovnik. In his theological work, he also translated the epistle of Girolamo Francesco Zanetti into Illyrian.

He died in Ragusa in 1777 at the age of 78.

== Selected works ==
- Monumenta historica provinciae Rhacusinae Ordinis, Naples, 1746
- Maximus Hieronymus vitae suae scriptor, sive de moribus, doctrina et rebus gestis divi Hieronymi Stridoniensis, Ancona, 1750
- De Illyricae linguae vetustate et amplitudine, dissertatio historico-chronologico-critica, Venice, 1754
- Fasti litterario-ragusini, Venice, 1767

== See also ==
- Republic of Ragusa
- List of notable Ragusans
- Dubrovnik
- Dalmatia
- History of Dalmatia
