= Lucinico =

Frazione of Italy

Coordinates: 45°56′N 13°34′E

Lucinico (Friulian: Lucinîs or Luzinìs, Slovene: Ločnik) is a frazione in Gorizia, in Friuli-Venezia Giulia.

The frazione lies 4.88 kilometres from the town of Gorizia.

== In literature ==
Lucinico is featured in the last chapter of Italo Svevo's novel Zeno's Conscience. In May 1915 the book's protagonist, a businessman from Trieste, comes with his wife and children to spend a vacation at a rented house in Lucinico. The outbreak of war between Italy and Austro-Hungary turns Lucinico into a war zone and the protagonist—setting out on a casual morning stroll without his hat and jacket—finds the front suddenly cutting him off from his family.
