= Vito Marija Bettera-Vodopić =

Croatian writer

- Born: 1771
- Died: 1841 (aged 69–70)

Vito Marija Bettera-Vodopić (1771–1841) was a writer and diplomat from the Republic of Ragusa.

== Works ==
Bettera entitled one of his political pamphlets Memoires sur une époque de ma vie ou appel aux hommes dhonneur et en particulier à ceux de Empire Vienne par Vite Marie de Bettera, Wodopich, gentilhomme ragusain (1816).

== Sources ==
- Miljenko Foretić, Bettera, Vito Marija. Hrvatski biografski leksikon, I: pp. 731-732
