= Rajmundo Kunić =

Croatian writer

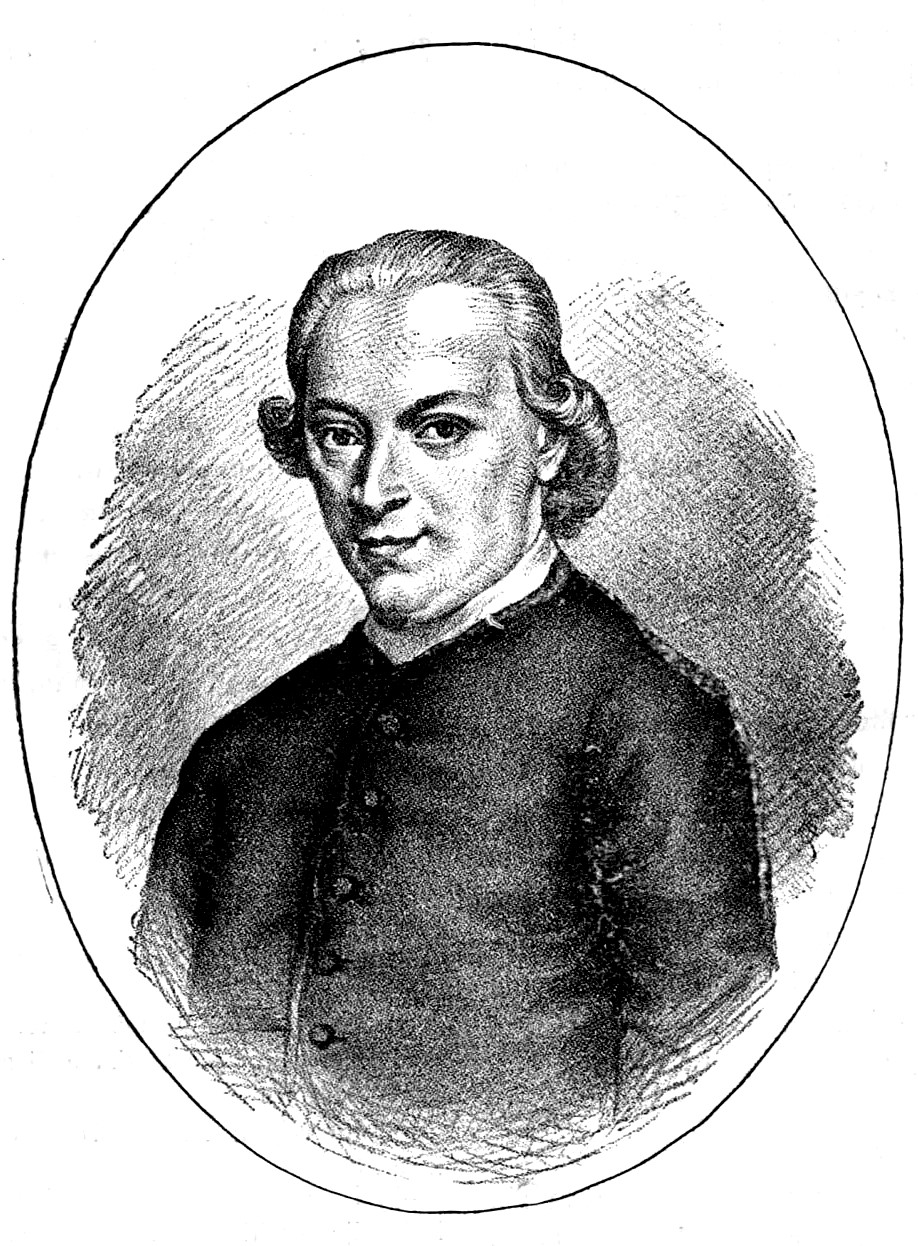
- Born: January 17, 1719; Dubrovnik, Republic of Ragusa, (modern-day Croatia)
- Died: November 22, 1794 (aged 75); Rome, Papal States
- Occupations: Priest, humanist

Rajmund Kunić or Raimondo Cunich (January 17, 1719 – November 22, 1794) was a Latin and Greek humanist from Dubrovnik, Republic of Ragusa (modern-day Croatia).

== Biography ==
Cunich was born in the Republic of Ragusa, in the small town of Cavtat (Italian: Ragusa Vecchia) at Dubrovnik. He lost his father early in life. In 1734, at age fifteen, he was sent to the order of the Society of Jesus (Jesuits) in Rome. He became, along with Ruđer Bošković, one of the most illustrious academics produced by the Republic of Ragusa.

Cunich spent twenty-seven years teaching Latin and Greek in Florence, Rome and other parts of Italy. He wrote several elegant orations, including one for Pope Clement XIII, and many epigrams and elegies following Tibullus and Catullus. He translated Theocritus and the epigrams of the Greek Anthology. His best-known work is the Latin translation of The Iliad: "Homeri Ilias Latinis Versibus Expressa" (1776).

== See also ==
- List of notable Ragusans
- Dalmatia
- History of Dalmatia
