= Cvijeta Zuzorić =

Lyric poet from the Republic of Ragusa

Cvijeta Zuzorić (Flora Zuzzeri, Flora Zuzori)
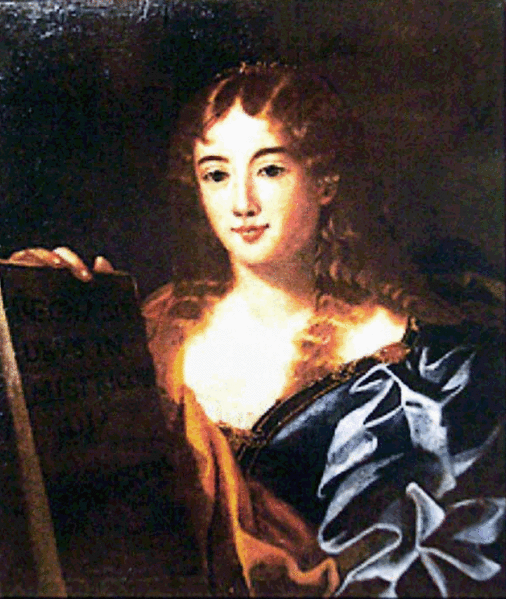
- Born: c. 1552; Republic of Ragusa
- Died: 1648; Ancona, Italy

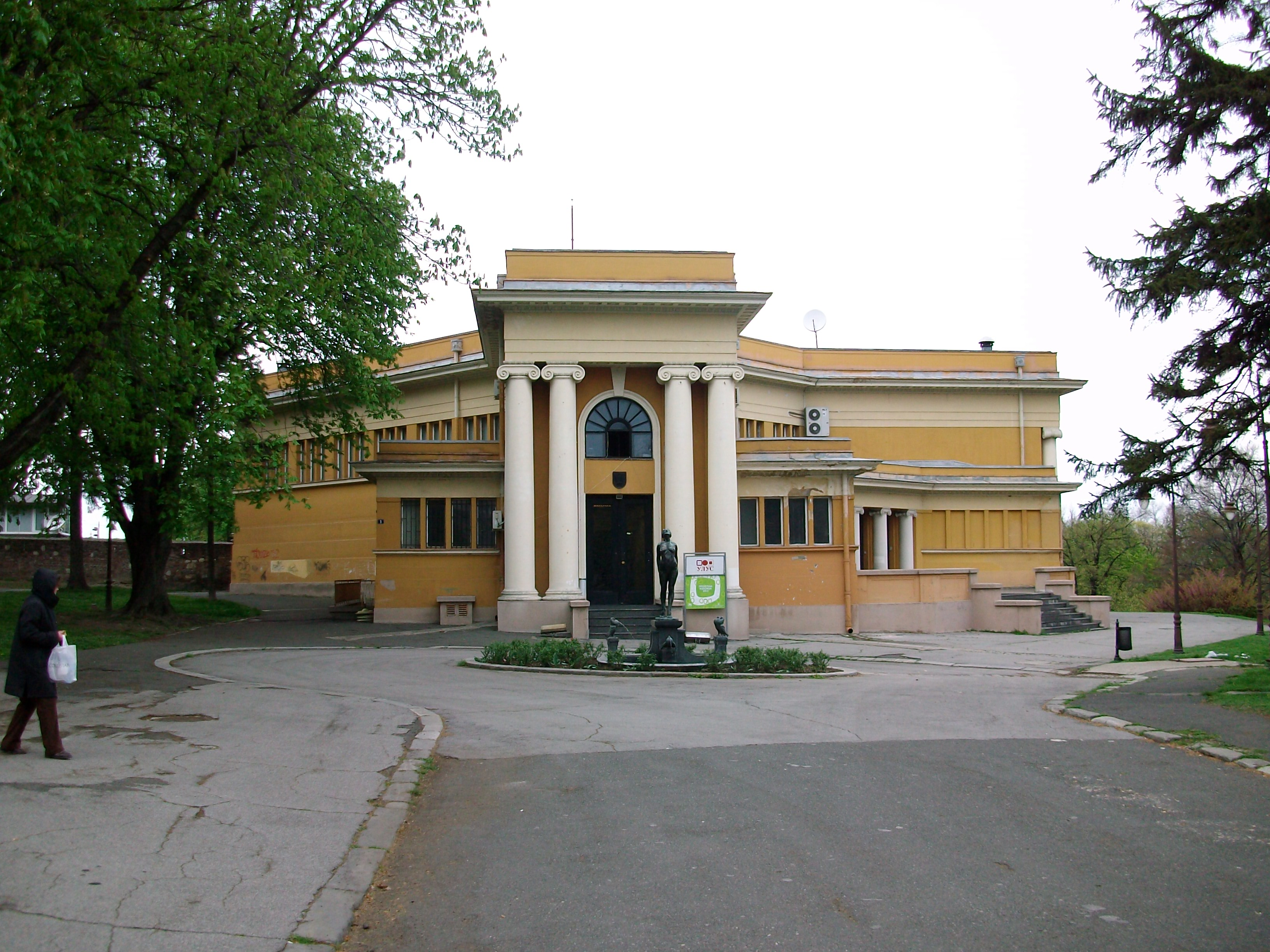
Cvijeta Zuzorić Art Pavilion in Belgrade was named after her.

Cvijeta Zuzorić (pronounced [tsʋijěta zûzoritɕ]; also Fiora Zuzori or Flora Zuzzeri) (1552–1648) was a Croatian lyric poet from the Republic of Ragusa. She wrote in Italian, Latin and Croatian.

== Life ==
She was born in Dubrovnik into a prominent merchant family, she was the daughter of Frano Zuzori (Zuzorić) and Marina Radagli. Early in her childhood, she moved with her parents to Ancona, where she was educated.

In 1570, she married a Florentine nobleman, merchant, and diplomat Bartolomeo Pescioni who had been Florentine consul in the Republic of Ragusa. In the same year, the couple moved to Ragusa where they lived for thirteen years, until Pescioni's debts and bankruptcy stemming from his failed textile trade business forced them to move back to Ancona, where she died.

Being a well-educated woman, she invited numerous authors and artists to her house, which was home to a widely known literary academy. Zuzorić was described as both an exceptionally beautiful and intelligent woman, and was said to have written excellent epigrams and gentle rhymes, most of which, however, have not survived. She is known only by reputation, since she was mentioned and celebrated in countless poems by Dinko Zlatarić, Miho Bona-Babulinov, Miho Monaldi, Boccabinco, Simonetti, Marin Bettera, her contemporaries, as well as later Ragusan authors.

She was mentioned in the sonnets of the famous Italian poet Torquato Tasso, who praised her virtues and beauty even though he had never met her. Her great friend Nikola Vitov Gučetić and his wife Marija Gundulić Gucić described her physical and spiritual beauty in his famous philosophical work on love, a treatise on the Meteors of Aristotle.

== See also ==
- Republic of Ragusa
- List of notable Ragusans
- Dubrovnik
- Dalmatia
- History of Dalmatia
- Cvijeta Zuzorić Art Pavilion

== Sources ==
- Bloomsbury Guide to Women's Literature
