= Dinko Zlatarić =

Croatian poet and translator

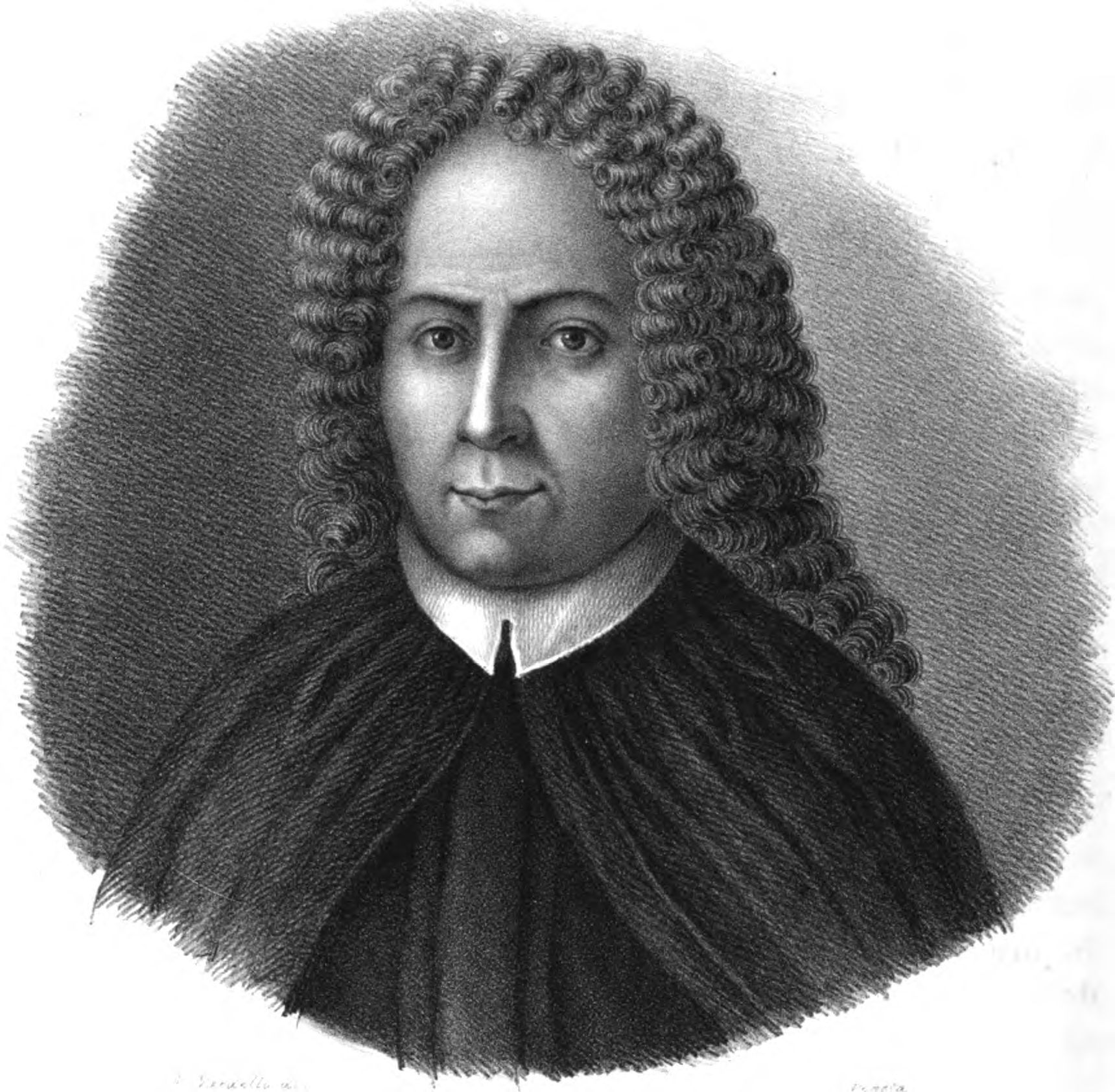
Dinko Zlatarić

Dominko "Dinko" Zlatarić (1558–1613) was a Croatian poet and translator from Republic of Ragusa, considered the best translator of the Renaissance.

== Life ==
Dominiko was the most famous member of the Zlatarić noble family from Dubrovnik. Dinko was born in 1558 as the son of Žimun (Simone Slatarich) Zlatarić and Frana, daughter of a very wealthy nobleman by the name of Dominik Kladurobović. Dinko's brother Mihajlo Zlatarić served as a major-lieutenant in the forces of Juraj IV Zrinski, while history didn't remember his other brothers Cvijeto and Nikola. His only sister Kata died by 1597. Dominiko had one son the name Žimun Zlatarić.

Learning Italian and Latin from a young age and writing his first poems when still a child, Dinko showed his talent early. Because of that, his father sent him to Padua, where after completing the famous Gymnasium, he entered the local University, where he learned rhetoric, philosophy and civil law. In 1579 he funded the printing of Italian poems of his close friend Caesar Simonetti and dedicated them to Cvijeta Zuzorić. He also studied Greek in Padua.

Because of his knowledge and seriousness, the students elected him rector on 13 August 1579. For keeping the peace and order at the university, he was rewarded by the Republic of Venice with the title of "Golden Knight" (eliues auratis). In 1580, a plaque was put at the university in his honor and he returned to his home Dubrovnik.

In 1587 he married Mara, the daughter of Pero Gomović. He shared his time between writing and running his estates in Cavtat and Konavle. He had friends among poets from Italy and Dubrovnik and admired the famous Renaissance beauty Cvijeta Zuzorić. Zlatarić wrote in Croatian and Italian – love poems, epitaphs and poetic meditations – but his greatest achievements are his translations.

He held an important place in the historiography of Croatian literature, as he explicitly declared the language of his works under its Croatian name, "iz veće tuđijeh jezika u hrvacki izložene".

== Translations and poems ==
He translated Tasso's manuscript of the pastoral drama Aminta in Padua in 1580. Later, dissatisfied with his translation, Zlatarić changed it, reworked it and adapted it to a Croatian setting, so it became Ljubmir. Then he published Electra, a Tragedy, and Ljubmir, a Pastoral History (a collection of his translations) and Love and Death of Pyramus and Thisbe, Translated into Croatian from Several Foreign Languages, in Venice in 1597. Zlatarić dedicated Electra to Juraj Zrinski, Ljubmir to Miho Matufić, and Pyramus and Thisbe to Cvijeta Zuzorić.

His translations from Greek, Italian and Latin included 26 original pjesni u smrt od razlicijeh (poems about various people's deaths). After his death, his son Miho Zlatarić collected and published 137 lyrical poems of his father under the title Pjesni razlike (Various Poems). Most of them are love poems.

Zlatarić was one of the most prolific epitaph writers of the Croatian Renaissance. The most effective one is his short epitaph to Dinko Ranjina (Nadgrobje Dinku Ranjini), followed by the epitaph to Bartolomeo Pescionio, the husband of Cvijeta Zuzorić. Zlatarić's poems are included in the Zadar Collection.

== Analysis ==
He wrote under the influence of the first generation of Croatian Petrarchists and Italian Petrarchist schools. His strong links with the local Petrarchist tradition are shown by his rich style. His varied expression, mastery of verse and sound, put Zlatarić among the best Croatian lyrical poets of his time.

Zlatarić is also renowned as the best translator of the Croatian Renaissance. He translated Tasso's Aminta literally, with the necessary changes forced by a different meter. The second version, Ljubmir, is even more refined, literary and pure, with a richer language. His translation of Sophocles' Electra reveals not only Zlatarić's education, taste and versifying ability, but also his poetic gift. Love of Pyramus and Thisbe is closer to a prose translation. In general, Zlatarić's translations can be considered independent poetic achievements, widening the range of Croatian Renaissance literature.

== Works ==
- Aminta, Padua, 1580
- Elektra, trađeija, Ljubmir, pripovijes pastijerska (Electra, a Tragedy, and Ljubmir, a Pastoral History), Venice, 1597
- Ljubav i smrt Pirama i Tizbe, iz veće tuđijeh jezika u hrvacki složene (Love and Death of Pyramus and Thisbe, Translated into Croatian from Several Foreign Languages), Venice, 1597
- Pjesni razlike (Various Poems), posthumous

== See also ==
- Republic of Ragusa
- Dubrovnik
