= Vlaho Getaldić =

Dalmatian writer, translator and politician

- Born: 22 December 1788; Dubrovnik
- Died: 27 October 1872 (aged 83); Dubrovnik
- Occupations: writer, politician

Vlaho Getaldić (also Biagio Ghetaldi; 22 December 1788 - 27 October 1872) was a Dalmatian writer, translator and politician from Dubrovnik.

Born in the Republic of Ragusa. He was the grand-nephew of the renowned Marin Getaldić, and descendant of Gundulić family through his mother's line. He was member and president of the Council "Reign of Dalmatia" based in the city of Zadar, which consisted of eight individuals. Ghetaldi married Ana de Bosdari. His cousin, the Mayor of Ragusa, Šišmundo Getaldić-Gundulić married with the sister of Malvina Bosdari.

The Austrian Empire gave him the title of Baron in 1846. In 1865 Vlaho translated Osman (by Ivan Gundulić) from Croatian into Latin hexameters. In the short introduction, Vlaho gave the rules of his translations.
Also, Vlaho wrote poetry in Latin.

== Notes ==
- Caesareo principi archiduci Austriae Regio Ungariae et Bohemiae Principi etc. etc., Dalmatiam primum auspicatissime invisenti Blasius A. Ghetaldi Jadera, Battara, 1842. In 8¡, brossura, pp. n. 24
- Biagio Barone Ghetaldi, Francesco Conte di Borelli, Discorsi sull'economia rurale in Dalmazia e particolarmente nel distretto di Zadar, Battara, Zadar 1850 .
- Ioannis Francisci Gondulae pat. Rag. Osmanides Latinis. versibus expressa, Venetiis, 1865. (izbor).
