= Biagio Bernardo Caboga =

Leader of the Ragusan uprising against the French

Biagio Bernardo Caboga (German: Blasius Bernhard von Caboga,French: Blaise Caboga) (1779-1854) was a Ragusan count (conte) and commander.

He participated in the Ragusan uprising against the French, who had occupied since 1806 (abolished in 1808), in 1813–14. With British support, he led the uprising after October 1813. Together with Austrian general Milutinović and British cannons, the Ragusan rebel leaders led the siege of the city in January 1814. The French surrendered on the 27th, marching out of the city on 28 January. Ragusa and its territories were handed over to the Habsburg monarchy in 1815. Despite his intelligence and ability, being described as having Alcibiades' qualities, his ambition seemed to have been the main cause to the failure of the aims of the rebellion.

== Sources ==
- Ćosić, Stjepan (2000). "Dubrovnik Under French Rule (1810–1814)" (PDF). Dubrovnik Annals (4): 103–142.
- Francis W. Carter (1972). Dubrovnik (Ragusa): A Classic City-state. Seminar Press. ISBN 978-0-12-812950-0.
- Harriet Bjelovučić (1970). The Ragusan Republic: Victim of Napoleon and Its Own Conservatism. Brill Archive. pp. 156–. GGKEY:1ERFSC27Z6S.
