= Republic of Ragusa =

1358–1808 maritime republic in Southern Europe (Dalmatia)

Republic of Ragusa Republica de Ragusa (Dalmatian) Respublica Ragusina (Latin) Repubblica di Ragusa (Italian) Dubrovačka Republika (Croatian)
- 1358–1808
- State flag Coat of arms
- Motto: Latin: Non bene pro toto libertas venditur auro Croatian: Sloboda se ne prodaje za svo zlato svijeta Italian: La libertà non si vende nemmeno per tutto l'oro del mondo "Liberty is not well sold for all the gold in the world"
- Borders of the Republic of Ragusa in 1789
- Status: Sovereign state which was a tributary state of: Kingdom of Hungary (1358–1458); Ottoman Empire (1458–1684); Habsburg Austria (1684–1806); First French Empire (1806–1808)
- Capital: Ragusa; 42°39′N 18°04′E
- Common languages: Official: Latin (1358–1492); Italian (1492–1807); Common: Dalmatian^{[a]}; Croatian^{[b]}
- Religion: Catholicism
- Government: Aristocratic maritime republic
- Rector as Head of state
  - 1358: Nikša Sorgo
  - 1807–1808: Sabo Giorgi
- Historical era: Middle Ages, Renaissance, Early modern period
  - City established: c. 614
  - Established: 1358
  - Fourth Crusade (Venetian invasion): 1205
  - Treaty of Zadar: 27 May 1358
  - Ottoman tributary: from 1458
  - Joint protectorate: from 1684
  - Invasion by France: 26 May 1806
  - Treaties of Tilsit: 9 July 1807
  - Annexation by Napoleonic Kingdom of Italy: 31 January 1808

Population
  - 16th century: 90,000
- Currency: Ragusa perpera and others
Preceded by
Republic of Venice
Succeeded by
Kingdom of Italy (Napoleonic)
Illyrian Provinces
Kingdom of Dalmatia
- Today part of: Croatia; Bosnia and Herzegovina; Montenegro
- ^{a} A Romance language similar to both Italian and Romanian^{b} While present in the region even before the establishment of the Republic, Croatian, also referred to as Slavic or Illyrian at the time, had not become widely spoken until the late 15th century.

The Republic of Ragusa (Note: Dalmatian: Republica de Ragusa; Latin: Respublica Ragusina; Italian: Repubblica di Ragusa; Croatian: Dubrovačka Republika; Venetian: Repùblega de Raguxa.) was an aristocratic maritime republic centered on the city of Dubrovnik (Ragusa in Italian and Latin; Raguxa in Venetian) in South Dalmatia (today in southernmost Croatia) in Southern Europe. It carried that name from 1358 until 1808, reaching its commercial peak in the 15th and 16th centuries. The republic was conquered by Napoleon's French Empire in 1806 and formally annexed by the Napoleonic Kingdom of Italy in 1808. By then it had a population of about 30,000 people, of whom 5,000 lived within the city walls. Its motto was "Non bene pro toto libertas venditur auro", a Latin phrase which can be translated as "Liberty is not well sold for all the gold".

== Names ==
Originally named Communitas Ragusina (Latin for "Ragusan municipality" or "community"), in the 14th century it was renamed Respublica Ragusina (Latin for Ragusan Republic), first mentioned in 1385. It was nevertheless a Republic under its previous name, although its Rector was appointed by Venice rather than by Ragusa's own Major Council. In Italian it is called Repubblica di Ragusa; in Croatian it is called Dubrovačka Republika (Croatian pronunciation: [dǔbroʋat͡ʃkaː rěpublika]). It is generally known in historiography as the Republic of Ragusa.

The Slavic name Dubrovnik is derived from the word dubrava, "an oak grove," by a folk etymology. The name Dubrovnik of the Adriatic city is first recorded in the Charter of Ban Kulin (1189). It came into use alongside Ragusa as early as the 14th century. The Latin, Italian and Dalmatian name Ragusa possibly derives its name from Lausa (from the Greek ξαυ: xau, "precipice"); it was later altered to Rausium, Rhagusium, Ragusium or Rausia (even Lavusa, Labusa, Raugia and Rachusa) and finally into Ragusa. Another theory is that the term "Ragusa" is related to Proto-Albanian *rāguša meaning 'grape' (compare Modern-Albanian rrush (meaning "grape")), according to V. Orel.

== Territory ==
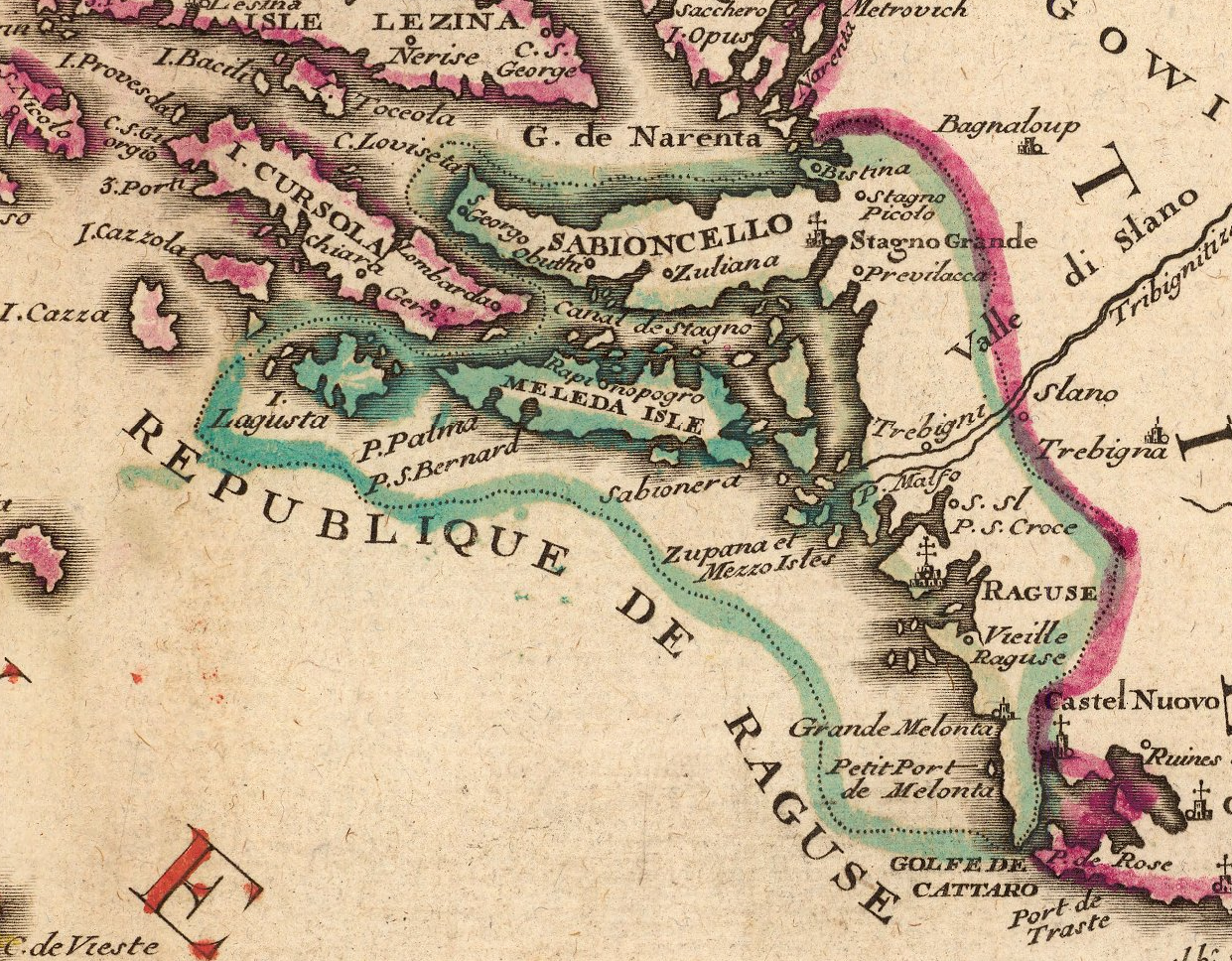
Territory of the Republic of Ragusa, early 18th century

The Republic ruled a compact area of southern Dalmatia – its final borders were formed by 1426 – comprising the mainland coast from Neum to the Prevlaka peninsula as well as the Pelješac peninsula and the islands of Lastovo and Mljet, as well as a number of smaller islands such as Koločep, Lopud, and Šipan.

In the 15th century the Ragusan republic also acquired the islands of Korčula, Brač and Hvar for about eight years. However they had to be given up due to the resistance of local minor aristocrats sympathizing with Venice, which was granting them some privileges.

In the 16th century the administrative units of the Republic were: the City of Ragusa (Dubrovnik), counties (Konavle, Župa dubrovačka – Breno, Slano – Ragusan Littoral, Ston, Island of Lastovo, Island of Mljet, Islands of Šipan, Lopud and Koločep) and captaincies (Cavtat, Orebić, Janjina) with local magistrates appointed by the Major Council. Lastovo and Mljet were semi-autonomous communities each having its own Statute. The Republic had a small colonial settlement in modern-day Gandaulim village in Goa, India. Named after Saint Blaise, the patron saint of Dubrovnik, their colony was established as Sao Braz between 1530 and 1535, amid broader Portuguese colonization.

== Historical background ==
=== Origin of the city ===
According to the De Administrando Imperio of the Byzantine emperor Constantine VII Porphyrogennetos, the city was founded, probably in the 7th century, by the inhabitants of the Greek city of Epidaurum (modern Cavtat) after its destruction by the Avars and Slavs c. 615. Some of the survivors moved 25 kilometres (16 miles) north to a small island near the coast where they founded a new settlement, Lausa. It has been claimed that a second raid by the Slavs in 656 resulted in the total destruction of Epidaurum. Slavs settled along the coast in the 7th century. The Slavs named their settlement Dubrovnik. The Byzantines and Slavs had an antagonistic relationship, though by the 12th century the two settlements had merged. The channel that divided the city was filled, creating the present-day main street (the Stradun) which became the city centre. Thus, Dubrovnik became the Slavic name for the united town. There are recent theories based on excavations that the city was established much earlier, at least in the 5th century and possibly during the Ancient Greek period (as per Antun Ničetić, in his book Povijest dubrovačke luke). The key element in this theory is the fact that ships in ancient time traveled about 45 to 50 nautical miles (83 to 93 km; 52 to 58 mi) per day, and mariners required a sandy shore to pull their ships out of the water for the rest period during the night. An ideal combination would have a fresh water source in the vicinity. Dubrovnik had both, being halfway between the Greek settlements of Budva and Korčula, which are 95 nautical miles (176 km; 109 mi) apart.

=== Early centuries ===
During its first centuries the city was under the rule of the Byzantine Empire. The Saracens laid siege to the city in 866–867; it lasted for fifteen months and was raised due to the intervention of Byzantine Emperor Basil I, who sent a fleet under Niketas Ooryphas in relief. Ooryphas' "showing of the flag" had swift results, as the Slavic tribes sent envoys to the Emperor, once more acknowledging his suzerainty. Basil dispatched officials, agents and missionaries to the region, restoring Byzantine rule over the coastal cities and regions in the form of the new theme of Dalmatia, while leaving the Slavic tribal principalities of the hinterland largely autonomous under their own rulers. With the weakening of Byzantium, Venice began to see Ragusa as a rival that needed to be brought under its control, but an attempt to conquer the city in 948 failed. The citizens of the city attributed this to Saint Blaise, whom they adopted as their patron saint.

The city remained under Byzantine domination until 1204, with the exception of periods of Venetian (1000–1030) and later Norman (1081–1085, 1172, 1189–1190) rule. In 1050, Croatian king Stjepan I (Stephen) made a land grant along the coast that extended the boundaries of Ragusa to Zaton, 16 km (10 mi) north of the original city, giving the republic control of the abundant supply of fresh water that emerges from a spring at the head of the Ombla inlet. Stephen's grant also included the harbour of Gruž, which is now the commercial port for Dubrovnik. Thus the original territory of the Ragusan municipality or community comprised the city of Ragusa, Župa dubrovačka, Gruž, Ombla, Zaton, the Elafiti islands (Šipan, Lopud and Koločep) and some smaller islands near the city.

The famous 12th century Arab geographer Muhammad al-Idrisi mentioned Ragusa and the surrounding area. In his work, he referred to Ragusa as the southernmost city of Croatia. In 1191, Emperor Isaac II Angelos granted the city's merchants the right to trade freely in Byzantium. Similar privileges were obtained several years earlier from Serbia (1186) and from Bosnia (1189). The Charter of Ban Kulin of Bosnia is also the first official document where the city is referred to as Dubrovnik.

=== Venetian suzerainty (1205–1358) ===
In 1202, the Venetian Republic invaded Dalmatia with the forces of the Fourth Crusade, and Ragusa was forced to pay tribute. Ragusa began supplying Venice with products such as hides, wax, silver, and other metals. Venice used the city as its naval base in the southern Adriatic Sea.

The Venetians used Ragusa as an important base for the traffic of the ancient Balkan slave trade, from which slaves were transported from the Balkans across the Adriatic Sea to the Aegean Sea, from which they were sold on to either slavery in Spain in the West or slavery in Egypt in the South.

Unlike with Zadar, there was not much friction between Ragusa and Venice as the city had not yet begun to compete as an alternative carrier in the trade between East and West; in addition, the city retained most of its independence. The people, however, resented the ever-growing tribute.

In the middle of the 13th century the island of Lastovo was added to the original territory. On 22 January 1325, Serbian king Stefan Uroš III issued a document for the sale of his maritime possessions of the city of Ston and peninsula of Pelješac to Ragusa. In 1333, during the rule of Serbian king Stefan Dušan (Stefan Uroš IV, r. 1331–1355), the two possessions were handed over to Ragusa. In January 1348, the Black Death struck the city and decimated the urban population.

== History ==
=== Independence from Venice (1358) ===
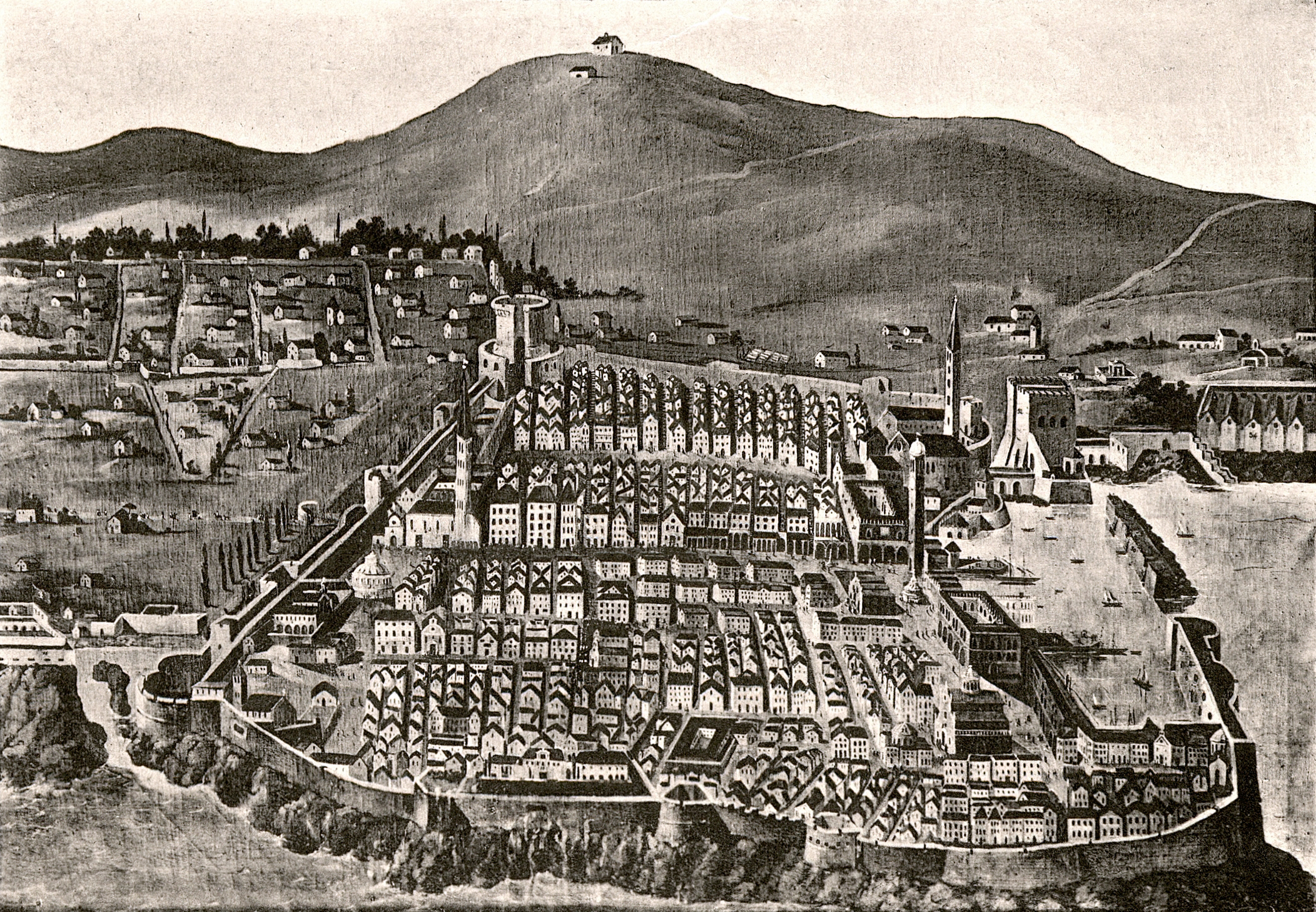
Dubrovnik before the 1667 earthquake

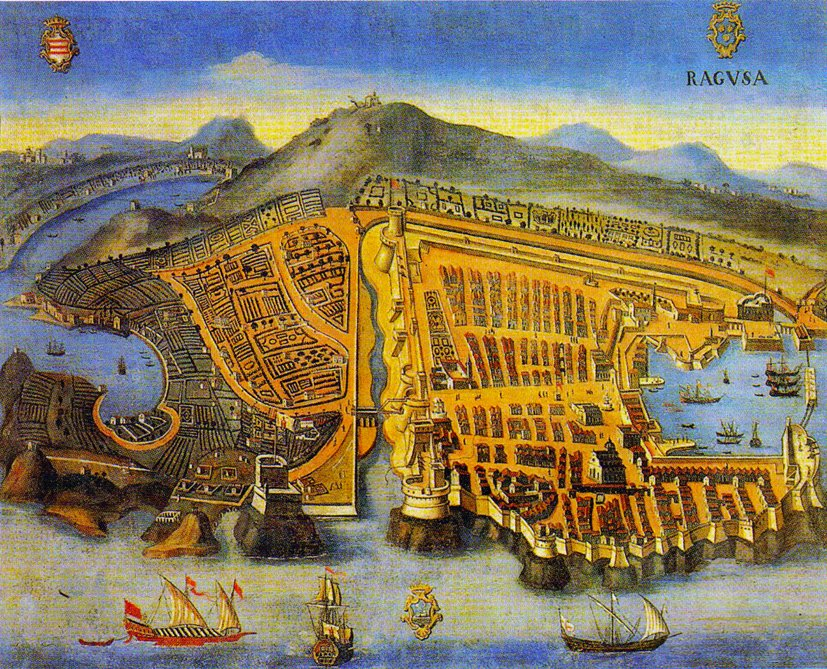
Painting of Dubrovnik from 1667

In 1358, the Treaty of Zadar forced Venice to yield all claims to Dalmatia. The city accepted the hegemony of King Louis I of Hungary. On 27 May 1358, the final agreement was reached at Visegrád between Louis and the Archbishop Ivan Saraka. The city recognized Hungarian sovereignty, but the local nobility continued to rule with little interference from the Hungarian court at Buda. The Republic profited from the suzerainty of Louis of Hungary, whose kingdom was not a naval power, and with whom they would have little conflict of interest. The last Venetian conte left, apparently in a hurry. Although under the Visegrád agreement Dubrovnik was formally under the jurisdiction of the ban of Croatia, the city successfully resisted both the royal and ban authority.

In 1372, the Ragusan Council passed drastic legislation barring all trade between foreigners within its territory, and further banning trade between Ragusans and foreigners. It seems these restrictions did not last long, given that such measures would have caused an economic collapse if enforced, and seem to have been no longer in effect by 1385 at the latest.

In 1399, the city acquired the area between Ragusa and Pelješac, called the Primorje (Croatian: Dubrovačko primorje) with Slano (Latin: Terrae novae). It was purchased from Bosnian King Stephen Ostoja. A brief war with Bosnia in 1403 and 1404 ended with Bosnian withdrawal. Between 1419 and 1426, the Konavle region, south of Astarea (Župa dubrovačka), including the city of Cavtat, was added to the Republic's possessions.

In the first half of the 15th century Cardinal Ivan Stojković (Johannes de Carvatia) was active in Dubrovnik as a Church reformer and writer. During the peak of trade relations between the Bosnian kingdom and other neighboring regions, the largest caravan trade route was established between Podvisoki and Ragusa. This trading activity culminated in the year 1428, on 9 August, when a group of Vlachs pledged to the lord of Ragusa, Tomo Bunić, that they would provide a delivery of 600 horses along with 1500 modius of salt. The intended recipient of the delivery was Dobrašin Veseoković, and in exchange the Vlachs agreed to receive payment equal to half the amount of salt delivered.

=== Ottoman suzerainty ===
In 1430 and 1442, the Republic signed short-term arrangements with the Ottoman Empire defining its status. In 1458, the Republic signed a treaty with the Ottomans which made it a tributary of the sultan. Under the treaty, the Republic owed the sultan "fidelity", "truthfulness", and "submission", and an annual tribute, which was in 1481 defined at 12,500 gold coins. The sultan guaranteed to protect Ragusa and granted them extensive trading privileges. Under the agreement, the republic retained its autonomous status and was virtually independent, and usually allied with the Maritime Republic of Ancona.

It could enter into relations with foreign powers and make treaties with them (as long as not conflicting with Ottoman interests), and its ships sailed under its own flag. Ottoman vassalage also conferred special trade rights that extended within the Empire. Ragusa handled the Adriatic trade on behalf of the Ottomans, and its merchants received special tax exemptions and trading benefits from the Porte. It also operated colonies that enjoyed extraterritorial rights in major Ottoman cities.

Merchants from Ragusa could enter the Black Sea, which was otherwise closed to non-Ottoman shipping. The Ragusan merchants paid less in customs duties than other foreign merchants, and the city-state enjoyed diplomatic support from multiple foreign powers, including from the Ottomans, in disputes with the Venetians.

For their part, Ottomans regarded Ragusa as a port of major importance, since most of the traffic between Florence and Bursa (an Ottoman port in northwestern Anatolia) was carried out via Ragusa. Florentine cargoes would leave the Italian ports of Pesaro, Fano or Ancona to reach Ragusa. From that point on they would take the land route Bosnasaray (Sarajevo)–Novibazar–Skopje–Plovdiv–Edirne.

When, in the late 16th century, Ragusa placed its merchant marine at the disposal of the Spanish Empire on condition that its participation in the Spanish military ventures would not affect the interest of the Ottoman Empire; the latter tolerated the situation as the trade of Ragusa permitted the importation of goods from states with which the Ottoman Empire was at war.

Along with England, Spain and Genoa, Ragusa was one of Venice's most damaging competitors in the 15th century on all seas, even in the Adriatic. Thanks to its proximity to the plentiful oak forests of Gargano, it was able to bid cargoes away from the Venetians.

=== Decline of the Republic ===
With the Portuguese explorations which opened up new ocean routes, the spice trade no longer went through the Mediterranean. Moreover, the discovery of the Americas started a crisis in Mediterranean shipping. This was the beginning of the decline of both the Venetian and Ragusan republics.

Charles VIII of France granted trading rights to the Ragusans in 1497, and Louis XII in 1502. In the first decade of the 16th century, Ragusan consuls were sent to France while their French counterparts were sent to Ragusa. Prominent Ragusans in France included Simon de Benessa, Lovro Gigants, D. de Bonda, Ivan Cvletković, captain Ivan Florio, Petar Lukarić (Petrus de Luccari), Serafin Gozze, and Luca de Sorgo. The Ragusan aristocracy was also well represented at the Sorbonne University in Paris.

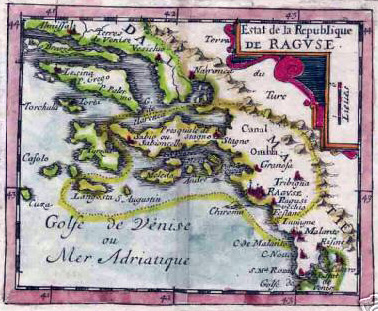
Old map of the Republic of Ragusa, dated 1678

The fate of Ragusa was linked to that of the Ottoman Empire. Ragusa and Venice lent technical assistance to the Ottoman–Mameluke–Zamorin alliance that the Portuguese defeated in the Battle of Diu in the Indian Ocean (1509).

On 6 April 1667, a devastating earthquake struck and killed around 2,000 citizens, and up to 1,000 in the rest of the republic, including many patricians and the Rector (Croatian: knez) Šišmundo Gundulić. The earthquake also leveled most of the city's public buildings, leaving only the outer walls intact. Buildings in the Gothic and Renaissance styles – palaces, churches and monasteries – were destroyed. Of the city's major public buildings, only the Sponza Palace and the front part of the Rector's Palace at Luža Square survived. Gradually the city was rebuilt in the more modest Baroque style. With great effort, Ragusa recovered a bit but still remained a shadow of the former Republic.

In 1677 Marin Caboga (1630–1692) and Nikola Bunić (c. 1635–1678) arrived in Constantinople in an attempt to avert an imminent threat to Ragusa: Kara-Mustafa's pretensions for the annexation of Ragusa to the Ottoman Empire. The Grand-Vizier, struck with the capacity Marin showed in the arts of persuasion and acquainted with his resources in active life, resolved to deprive his country of so able a diplomat, and on 13 December he was imprisoned, where he was to remain for several years. In 1683, Kara-Mustafa was killed in the attacks on Vienna, and Marin was soon free to return to Ragusa.

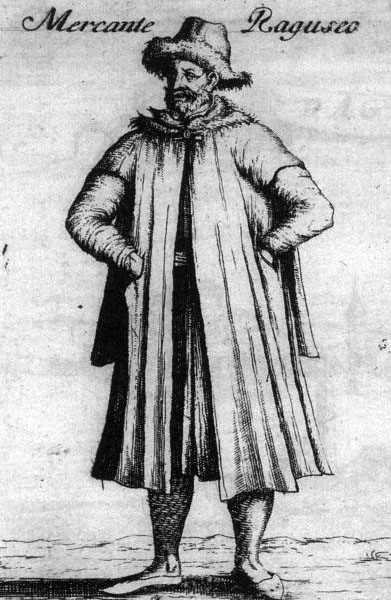
A merchant from the Republic, 1708

In 1683 the Ottomans were defeated in the Battle of Kahlenberg outside Vienna. The field marshal of the Austrian army was Ragusan Frano Đivo Gundulić. In 1684, the emissaries renewed an agreement contracted in Visegrád in the year 1358 and accepted the sovereignty of Habsburg as Hungarian Kings over Ragusa, with an annual tax of 500 ducats. At the same time, Ragusa continued to recognize the sovereignty of the Ottomans, a common arrangement at the time. This opened up greater opportunities for Ragusa ships in ports all along the Dalmatian coast, in which they anchored frequently. After this, Venice captured a part of Ragusa's inland area and approached its borders. They presented the threat of completely surrounding and cutting off Ragusa's trade inland. In view of this danger and anticipating the defeat of the Ottomans in 1684 Ragusa sent emissaries to Emperor Leopold in Vienna, hoping that the Austrian Army would capture Bosnia. Unfortunately for the Republic, the Ottomans retained control over their hinterland. In the Treaty of Karlowitz (1699), the Ottomans ceded large territories to the victorious Habsburgs, Venetians, Poles, and Russians, but retained Herzegovina. The Republic of Ragusa ceded two patches of its coast to the Ottoman Empire so that the Republic of Venice would be unable to attack from land, only from the sea. One of them, the northwestern land border with the small town of Neum, is today the only outlet of present-day Bosnia and Herzegovina to the Adriatic Sea. The southeastern border village of Sutorina later became part of Montenegro, which has a coastline to the south. After the treaty, Neum and Sutorina were attached to Sanjak of Herzegovina of Bosnia Eyalet. Ragusa continued its policy of strict neutrality in the War of Austrian succession (1741–48) and in the Seven Years' War (1756–63).

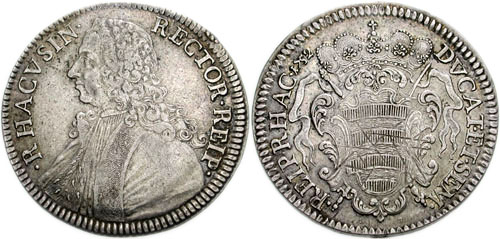
Ragusan tallero (1½ ducat) of 1752 with the effigy of a former Rector

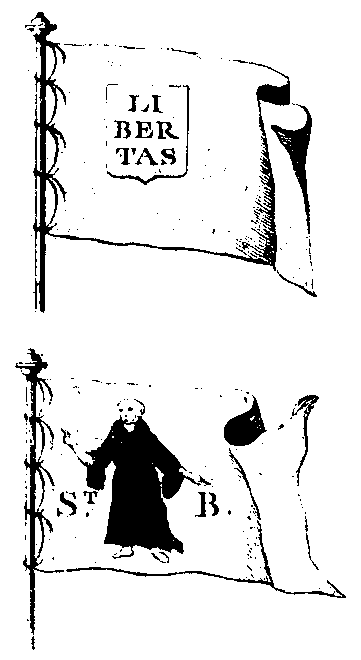
Flags of the Republic of Ragusa in the 18th century, according to the French Encyclopédie

In 1783, the Ragusan Council did not answer the proposition put forward by their diplomatic representative in Paris, Frano Favi, that they should establish diplomatic relations with America, although the Americans agreed to allow Ragusan ships free passage in their ports.

The first years of the French war were prosperous for Ragusa. The flag of Saint Blaise being neutral, the Republic became one of the chief carriers of the Mediterranean. The Continental Blockade was the life of Ragusa; and before the rise of Lissa the manufacturers of England, excluded from the ports of France, Italy, Holland, and Germany, found their way to the center of Europe through Saloniki and Ragusa.

=== French occupation ===
The Battle of Austerlitz and the consequent peace treaty, having compelled Austria to hand over Dalmatia to France, put Ragusa in a dilemma. The nearby Bay of Kotor was a Venetian frontier against the Ottomans. But while France held the land, the United Kingdom and Russia held the sea; and while French troops marched from Austerlitz to Dalmatia, eleven Russian ships of the line entered the Bay of Kotor, and landed 6,000 men, later supported by 16,000 Montenegrins under Petar I Petrović-Njegoš. As 5,000 Frenchmen under General Molitor marched southwards and peacefully took control of the fortresses of Dalmatia, the Russians pressed the senators of Ragusa to allow them to occupy the city, as it was an important fortress – thus anticipating that France might block further progress to Kotor. As there was no way from Dalmatia to Kotor but through Ragusa, General Molitor was equally ardent in trying to win Ragusa's support.

The Republic was determined to maintain its strict neutrality, knowing that anything else would mean its destruction. The Senate dispatched two emissaries to Molitor to dissuade him from entering Ragusan territory. Despite his statement that he intended to respect and defend the independence of the Ragusan Republic, his words demonstrated that he had no qualms about violating the territory of a neutral nation on his way to take possession of Kotor, and he even said that he would cross the Ottoman territories of Neum and Sutorina (bordering the Republic to the north and south, respectively) without asking permission from the Ottoman Empire. To the emissaries' protestation he responded by promising to respect Ragusan neutrality and not enter its territory in exchange for a loan of 300,000 francs. It was clearly blackmail (a similar episode occurred in 1798, when a Revolutionary French fleet threatened invasion if the Republic did not pay a huge contribution). The Ragusan government instructed the emissaries to inform Molitor that the Russians told the Republic quite clearly that should any French troops enter Ragusan territory, the Russians and their Montenegrin allies would proceed to pillage and destroy every part of the Republic, and also to inform him that the Republic could neither afford to pay such an amount of money, nor could it raise such an amount from its population without the Russians being alerted, provoking an invasion. Even though the emissaries managed to persuade General Molitor not to violate Ragusan territory, Napoleon was not content with the stalemate between France and Russia concerning Ragusa and the Bay of Kotor and soon decided to order the occupation of the Republic.

Upon entering Ragusan territory and approaching the capital, the French General Jacques Lauriston demanded that his troops be allowed to rest and be provided with food and drink in the city before continuing on to Kotor. However, this was a deception because as soon as they entered the city, they proceeded to occupy it in the name of Napoleon. The next day, Lauriston demanded an impossible contribution of a million francs.

The Times in London reported these events in its edition of 24 June 1806:

General Lauriston took possession of the City and Republic of Ragusa, on the 27th of May. The Proclamation which he published on that occasion is a most extraordinary document. The only reason advanced for this annihilation of the independence of that little State is an obscure insinuation, that the enemies of France exercised too much influence there. The Proclamation does not mention in what respect this influence has proved prejudicial to France, although the dignity of Buonaparte, it seems, is concerned in putting an end to it. M. Lauriston would have come off much better, if he had disdained making any excuse, and suffered the circumstance to stand upon its own unqualified foundations of state necessity and the right of the strongest. A very important fact is, however, disclosed in this Proclamation. It is not the surrender of Cattaro, it seems, that will satisfy the Emperor of the French. He looks forward to the evacuation of Corfu, and the whole of the Seven Islands, as well as the retreat of the Russian squadron from the Adriatic. Until that be effected, he will retain possession of Ragusa; but is there anyone who will believe, that if there was not a Russian flag or stand of colours to be seen in Albania, or on the Adriatic, that he would reestablish that Republic in its former independence?"

Almost immediately after the beginning of the French occupation, Russian and Montenegrin troops entered Ragusan territory and began fighting the French army, raiding and pillaging everything along the way and culminating in a siege of the occupied city during which 3,000 cannonballs fell on the city. The environs, thick with villas, the results of a long prosperity, were plundered, including half a million sterling.

The city was in the utmost straits; General Molitor, who had advanced within a few days' march of Ragusa, made an appeal to the Dalmatians to rise and expel the Russian–Montenegrin force, which met with a feeble response. Only three hundred men joined him, but a stratagem made up for his deficiency of numbers. A letter, seemingly confidential, was dispatched to General Lauriston in Ragusa, announcing his proximate arrival to raise the siege with such a force of Dalmatians as must overwhelm the Russians and the vast Montenegrin army; which letter was, as intended by Molitor, intercepted and believed by the besieging Russians. With his force thinly scattered, to make up a show, Molitor now advanced towards Ragusa, and turning the Montenegrin position in the valley behind, threatened to surround the Russians who occupied the summit of the hill between him and the city; but seeing the risk of this, the Russians retreated back towards the Bay of Kotor, and the city was relieved. The Montenegrin army had followed the order of Admiral Dmitry Senyavin who was in charge of the Russian troops, and retreated to Cetinje.

=== End of the Republic ===
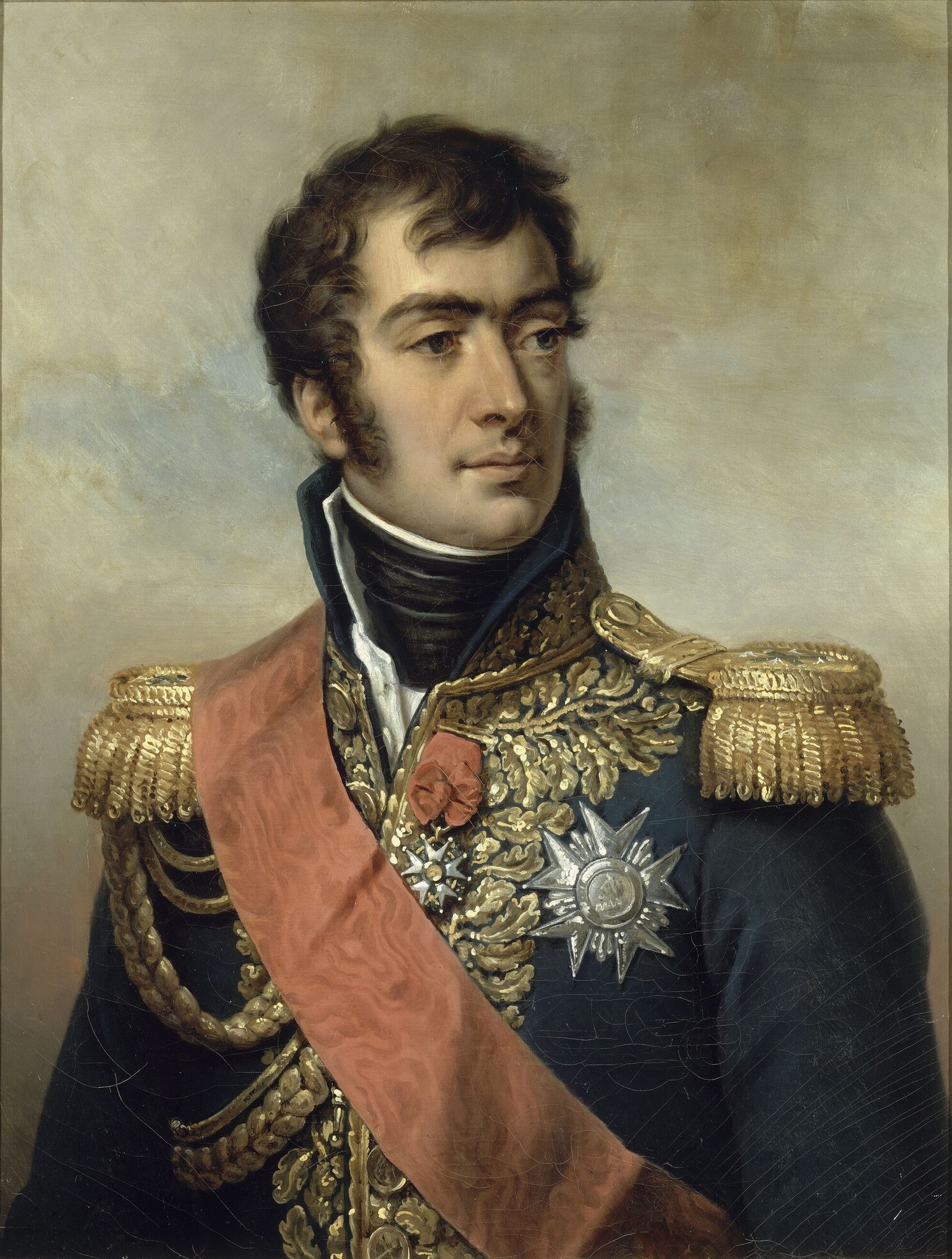
Marshal Auguste de Marmont, Duke of Ragusa, during French rule

Around 1800, the Republic had a highly organized network of consulates and consular offices in more than eighty cities and ports around the world. In 1808, Marshal Marmont issued a proclamation abolishing the Republic of Ragusa and amalgamating its territory into the Napoleonic Kingdom of Italy, himself claiming the newly created title of "Duke of Ragusa" (Duc de Raguse). In 1810, Ragusa, together with Dalmatia and Istria, went to the newly created French Illyrian Provinces. Later, in the 1814 Battle of Paris, Marmont abandoned Napoleon and was branded a traitor. Since he was known as the "Duke of Ragusa", the word ragusade was coined in French to signify treason and raguser meant a cheat.

Article 44 of the 1811 decree abolished the centuries-old institution of fideicommissum in inheritance law, by which the French enabled younger noblemen to participate in that part of the family inheritance, which the former law had deprived them of. According to an 1813 inventory of the Ragusan district, 451 land proprietors were registered, including ecclesiastical institutions and the commune. Although there is no evidence of the size of their estates, the nobles, undoubtedly, were in possession of most of the land. Eleven members of the Sorgo family, eight of Gozze, six of Ghetaldi, six of Pozza, four of Zamagna and three of the Saraca family were among the greatest landowners. The citizens belonging to the confraternities of St. Anthony and St. Lazarus owned considerable land outside the city.

After seven years of French occupation, encouraged by the desertion of French soldiers after the failed invasion of Russia and the reentry of Austria in the war, all the social classes of the Ragusan people rose up in a general insurrection, led by the patricians, against the Napoleonic invaders. On 18 June 1813, together with British forces they forced the surrender of the French garrison of the island of Šipan, soon also the heavily fortified town of Ston and the island of Lopud, after which the insurrection spread throughout the mainland, starting with Konavle. They laid siege to the occupied city, helped by the British Royal Navy, who had enjoyed unopposed domination over the Adriatic sea, under the command of Captain William Hoste, with his ships HMS Bacchante and HMS Saracen. Soon the population inside the city joined the insurrection. The Austrian Empire sent a force under General Todor Milutinović offering to help their Ragusan allies. However, as was soon shown, their intention was to in fact replace the French occupation of Ragusa with their own. Seducing one of the temporary governors of the Republic, Biagio Bernardo Caboga, with promises of power and influence (which were later cut short and who died in ignominy, branded as a traitor by his people), they managed to convince him that the gate to the east was to be kept closed to the Ragusan forces and to let the Austrian forces enter the city from the west, without any Ragusan soldiers, once the French garrison of 500 troops under General Joseph de Montrichard had surrendered.

The Major Council of the Ragusan nobility (as the assembly of 44 patricians who had been members of the Major Council before the Republic was occupied by France) met for the last time on 18 January 1814 in the Villa Giorgi in Mokošica, Ombla, in an effort to restore the Republic of Ragusa.

On 27 January, the French capitulation was signed in Gruž and ratified the same day. It was then that Biagio Bernardo Caboga openly sided with the Austrians, dismissing the part of the rebel army which was from Konavle. Meanwhile, Đivo Natali and his men were still waiting outside the Ploče Gates. After almost eight years of occupation, the French troops marched out of Dubrovnik on 27 and 28 January 1814. On the afternoon of 28 January 1814, the Austrian and British troops made their way into the city through the Pile Gates. With Caboga's support, General Milutinović ignored the agreement he had made with the nobility in Gruž. The events which followed can be best epitomized in the so-called flag episode.

The Flag of Saint Blaise was flown alongside the Austrian and British colors, but only for two days because, on 30 January, General Milutinović ordered Mayor Sabo Giorgi to lower it. Overwhelmed by a feeling of deep patriotic pride, Giorgi, the last Rector of the Republic and a loyal francophile, refused to do so "for the masses had hoisted it". Subsequent events proved that Austria took every possible opportunity to invade the entire coast of the eastern Adriatic, from Venice to Kotor. The Austrians did everything in their power to eliminate the Ragusa issue at the Congress of Vienna. Ragusan representative Miho Bona, elected at the last meeting of the Major Council, was denied participation in the Congress, while Milutinović, prior to the final agreement of the allies, assumed complete control of the city.

Regardless of the fact that the government of the Ragusan Republic never signed any capitulation nor relinquished its sovereignty, which according to the rules of Klemens von Metternich that Austria adopted for the Vienna Congress should have meant that the Republic would be restored, the Austrian Empire managed to convince the other allies to allow it to keep the territory of the Republic. While many smaller and less significant cities and former countries were permitted an audience, that right was refused to the representative of the Ragusan Republic. All of this was in blatant contradiction to the solemn treaties that the Austrian Emperors signed with the Republic: the first on 20 August 1684, in which Leopold I promised and guaranteed inviolate liberty ("inviolatam libertatem") to the Republic, and the second in 1772, in which the Empress Maria Theresa promised protection and respect of the inviolability of the freedom and territory of the Republic.

At the Congress of Vienna, Ragusa and the territories of the former Republic were made part of the crown land of the Kingdom of Dalmatia, ruled by the Habsburg monarchy, which became known as Austria-Hungary in 1867, which it remained a part of until 1918.

After the fall of the Republic, most of the aristocracy died out or emigrated overseas; around one fifth of the noble families were recognized by the Habsburg monarchy. Some of the families that were recognized and survived were the Ghetaldi-Gundula, Gozze, Kaboga, Sorgo, Zlatarić, Zamagna, Pozza, Gradi and Bona.

== Government ==
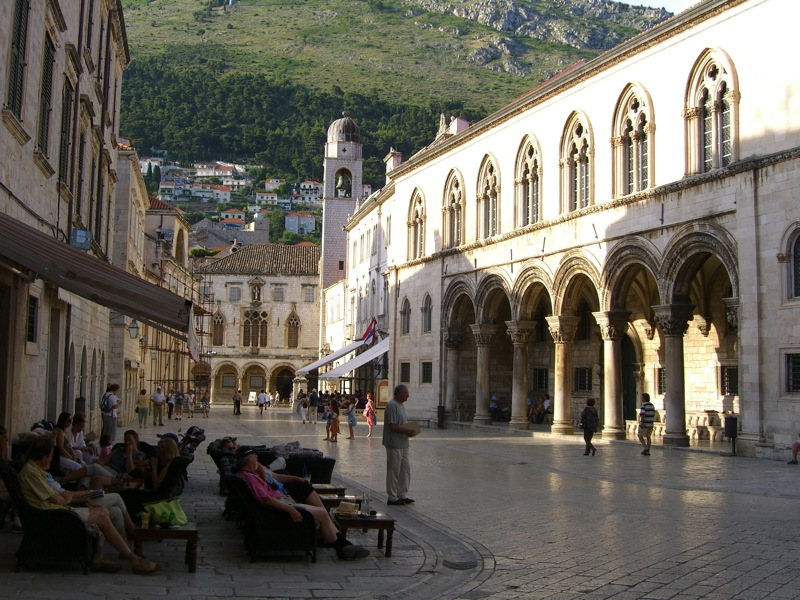
The Rector's Palace (the seat of the Rector, the Minor Council, the Senate and the administration of the Republic from the 14th century to 1808), behind it the Sponza Palace

The Republican Constitution of Ragusa was strictly aristocratic. The population was divided into three classes: nobility, citizens, and plebeians, who were mainly artisans and farmers (serfs, coloni and freemen). All effective power was concentrated in the hands of the aristocracy. The citizens were permitted to hold only minor offices, while plebeians had no voice in government. Marriage between members of different classes of the society was forbidden.

The organization of the government was based on the Venetian model: the administrative bodies were the Major Council (Consilium maius, Maggior Consiglio, Velje vijeće), the Minor Council (Consilium minus, Minor Consiglio, Malo vijeće) (from 1238) and the Senate (Consilium rogatorum, Consiglio dei Pregadi, Vijeće umoljenih) from 1253. The head of the state was the Rector.

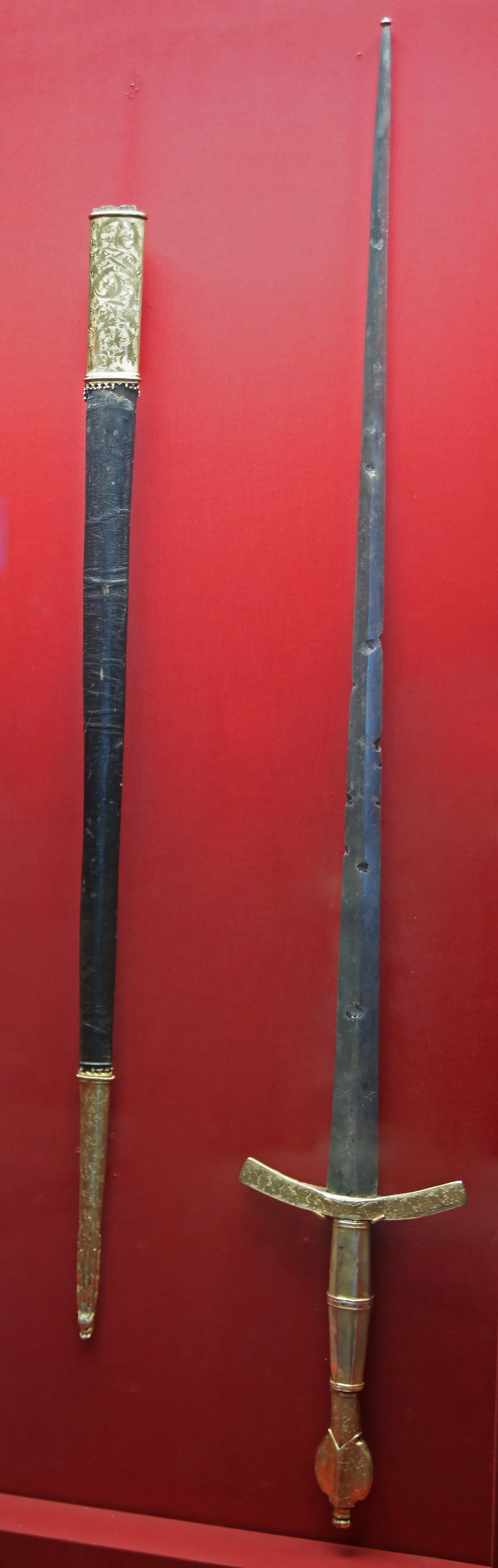
Ceremonial sword of the Rector of Ragusa, donated 1466 by King Matthias Corvinus as a sign of his judicial authority

The Major Council consisted only of members of the aristocracy; every noble took his seat at the age of 18 (from 1332 when the council was "closed" and only male members of Ragusian noble families had seat in it – Serrata del Maggior Consiglio Raguseo). It was the supreme governing and legislative body which (after 1358) elected other councils, officials and the Rector.

Every year, members of the Minor Council were elected by the Major Council. Together with the Rector, the Minor Council had both executive and ceremonial functions. It consisted first of eleven members and after 1667 of seven members.

The main power was in the hands of the Senate, which had 45 members over 40 years of age, elected for one year also by the Major Council. First it had only consultative functions, later (during the 16th century) the Senate became the real government of the Republic. In the 18th century the Senate was de facto the highest institution of the Republic and senators became "nobles of the nobility".

While the Republic was under the rule of Venice (1204–1358), the duke – head of the state (Latin: comes, Italian: conte, Croatian: knez) was Venetian; but after 1358 the elected Rector (from 1358 nominal head of the state was known as Latin: rector, Italian: rettore, Croatian: knez) was always a person from the Republic of Ragusa chosen by the Major Council. The length of the Rector's service was only one month, and a person was eligible for reelection after two years. The rector lived and worked in the Rector's Palace.

This organization was designed to prevent any single family from gaining absolute control, such as the Medici had done in Florence. Nevertheless, historians agree that the Giorgi and Sorgo families generally had the greatest influence (especially during the 18th century).

Until the 15th century, judicial functions were in the hand of the Minor Council, then a separate civil court and criminal court were established, leaving the Minor Council and the Senate only supreme appellate jurisdiction. Judges of the criminal and civil court were Ragusan patricians elected annually by the Major Council.

The officials known as provveditori supervised the work and acts of the councils, courts, and other officials. Known as the "guardians of justice", they could suspend decisions of the Minor Council, presenting them to the Senate for final deliberation. Provveditori were annually elected by the Major Council among patricians above 50 years of age.

The government of the Republic was liberal in character and early showed its concern for justice and humanitarian principles, but also conservative considering government structure and social order. An inscription on the council's offices read: Obliti privatorum publica curate (Manage the public affairs as if you had no private interests). The Republic's flag had the word Libertas (freedom) on it, and the entrance to the Saint Lawrence fortress (Lovrijenac) just outside the Ragusa city walls bears the inscription Non bene pro toto libertas venditur auro (Liberty can not be sold for all the gold of the world). The slave trade (Balkan slave trade) was forbidden in 1416. The Republic was a staunch opponent of the Eastern Orthodox Church and only Roman Catholics could acquire Ragusan citizenship.

=== Aristocracy ===
The city was ruled by the aristocracy, and marriage between members of three different social classes was strictly forbidden. The Ragusan aristocracy evolved in the 12th century through the 14th century. It was finally established by statute in 1332. New families were accepted only after the earthquake in 1667.

The Ragusan archives document, Speculum Maioris Consilii Rectores, lists all the persons that were involved in the Republic's government between September 1440 and January 1808. Of 4397 rectors elected, 2764 (63%) were from "old patrician" families: Gozze, Bona, Caboga, Cerva, Ghetaldi, Giorgi, Gradi, Pozza, Saraca, Sorgo, and Zamanya. An 1802 list of the republic's governing bodies showed that six of the eight Minor Council and 15 of the 20 Major Council members were from the same 11 families.

Because of the decrease of their numbers and lack of noble families in the neighborhood (the surroundings of Dubrovnik was under Ottoman control) the aristocracy became increasingly closely related, and marriages between relatives of the third and fourth degree were frequent.

=== Relations among the nobility ===
The nobility survived even when the classes were divided by internal disputes. When Marmont arrived in Dubrovnik in 1808, the nobility was divided into two blocks, the "Salamankezi" (Salamanquinos) and the "Sorbonezi" (Sorboneses). These names alluded to a certain controversy arisen from the wars between Holy Roman Emperor Charles V and King Francis I of France, which happened some 250 years previously. After the 1667 earthquake killed many nobles, some plebeians were introduced into the noble class. The "salamanquinos", those in favor of Spanish absolutism, did not treat these new nobles like equals; but the inclined "sorboneses", who sided with the French and to a certain liberalism, accepted them. Both sides retained their status and were seated together in the council, but they did not maintain social relations and did not even greet each other in the streets; an inconvenient marriage between members of both groups was as striking as if it occurred between members of different classes. This social split was also reflected in the plebeians, who were divided into the rival brotherhoods of Saint Antony and Saint Lazarus, which were as unfriendly in their relations as the "salamanquinos" and "sorboneses".

== Economy ==
=== Currency ===
The Republic of Ragusa used various currencies over time and in a variety of systems, including the artiluc, perpera, dukat and libertine.

=== Slave trade ===
One of the trades practiced by the Republic of Ragusa aside from the trade in spices, salt, wax and minerals, was the slave trade. For a period of time, the slave trade was an important part of the economy.

Ragusa had a close trade relationship with the Republic of Venice, who used Ragusa as an important transshipment point between the Balkans and the Mediterranean world; not only for the import of Balkan metal, but also of slave laborers.

The Republic of Venice used Ragusa as an important base and middleman in the ancient Balkan slave trade, in which Slavs from the Balkans were trafficked to the ports of the Adriatic coast and sold to Venetian merchants. The Venetian merchants of the Venetian slave trade used Ragusa as a base where they purchased slaves and transported them across the Adriatic Sea to the slave market in the Aegean Sea, where they were sold on to either slavery in Spain in the West or slavery in Egypt in the South.

In the late 13th century between 50 and 200 bonded laborers termed as servi (male) and ancillae (female) were imported to Ragusa from the surrounding Slavic-speaking regions every year. The Slavic servants had sometimes been sold by their families, potentially for a fixed period of time after which they would be released. Others were kidnapped and sold by warlords, landlords, merchants, or citizens of the surrounding territories. Some of the servants were contracted in Ragusa where they worked or were rented out to private households, but other Slavs were sold as slaves and trafficked on cargo vessels across the Adriatic Sea to Venice, Apulia and Sicily in Italy; to Catalonia in Spain; or Palestine and Egypt and Slavery in the Mamluk Sultanate.

In 1416 Ragusa banned the trafficking in slaves from Slavic Balkan lands. The ban was introduced after reports that Ragusan merchants living on the island of Narenta had sold some of the islands peasant population to the Ragusan slave trade. However, the institution of slavery as such was not banned in Ragusa, only the slave trade in Slavic slaves. Slavery was however not a big institution in Ragusa, where most slaves were domestic house slaves, were allowed to file complaints against their masters and could buy themselves free after working for a salary.

== Coat of arms ==
Today the coat of arms of Ragusa, in its red and blue version, can be seen in the coat of arms on the Croatian flag as it constitutes a historic part of Croatia.

== Population ==
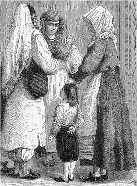
Ragusan clothing

The historian Nenad Vekarić used tax evidence from the Dubrovnik littoral (Croatian: Dubrovačko Primorje) and a census to find that the Republic of Dubrovnik (Ragusa) had a population of nearly 90,000 by 1500. From then to 1700 the population declined: in the first half of the 16th century it had more than 50,000 inhabitants; in the second half of the 16th century, between 50,000 and 60,000; in the 1630s, about 40,000; and in 1673–74, only 26,000 inhabitants. In the second half of the 15th century, due to Turkish expansion, Dubrovnik received a large number of Christian refugees from Bosnia and Herzegovina, offering them the less fertile land. Numerous epidemics, the Candian War of 1645–69, the 1667 earthquake, and emigration greatly reduced the population levels. The population of the republic never again reached its previous levels. The Italian element survived the fall of the Republic of Ragusa but faded away under Austrian rule: by 1900, 6.5% Ragusans were identified as Italians in contrast to 72.3% identified as Croatians.

Estimated population of the Republic of Ragusa (Vekarić 1991)
Year	Total population	Houses	Area population			
Year	Total population	Houses	Dubrovnik (city)	Dubrovnik littoral (Note: Without Cavtat or Obod.)	Pelješac	Ria and islands
1498	88,548	5795	9000	38,130	19,820	21,598
1536	65,022	4155	8500	27,094	14,082	15,346
1546	51,849	3345	8000	21,006	10,938	11,905
1549	52,775	3454	8000	21,434	11,184	12,157
1577	55,325	4128	7500	21,719	13,121	12,985
1583	55,115	4218	7500	21,549	13,138	12,928
1588	53,816	4195	7500	20,969	12,772	12,575
1606	48,952	4133	7000	19,079	11,483	11,390
1610	48,195	4140	7000	18,681	11,329	11,185
1626	43,011	3986	6500	16,714	9884	9913
1642	38,699	3956	6000	14,974	8847	8878
1673/4	26,067	3013	5500	18,046	5775	5584

=== Culture and ethnic identity ===
The Dalmatian city-states were characterized by common Latin laws, Catholic religion, language, commerce, and political and administrative structures; however, their rural hinterland was controlled by Slavic people who arrived in the 7th century. In the republic, only Roman Catholics and Jews had the right to profess religion, while Orthodox Christians were prohibited (and could not stay in the city during the night without special permission). In 1745, old customs that the Orthodox priest could not stay for more than eight days were re-affirmed, and they had to have a guard escort (so-called "barabants" who usually were Croats hired from outside the republic). The employment of the Orthodox population from the hinterland was not uncommon, but after the contract expired, if converted to Catholicism they would return to Orthodoxy.

The pre-modern people of Ragusa identified themselves as "Ragusans" (Raguseus, Raguseo), which was defined by jurisdictional criteria as a citizen of the city or republic, and confessionally a Roman Catholic, while in an ethnic sense it was identified with the wider proto-national context of "Illyrians", "Slovincians", "Dalmatians" (all three synonyms for Croats), or simply as "Croats". For example, in 1446, the state wrote a letter to the government of Barcelona in which it protested that the Ragusan merchants were paying customs duties as if they were Italians, noting that "Ragusans are not Italians ... exactly the opposite, that are by own language and own criteria of location, Dalmatians and subjects of the province of Dalmatia". Nearly the same thing happened in 1558 with Ragusan merchants in England.

Russian statesman and diplomat Pyotr Andreyevich Tolstoy, during his 1697–1699 visit of the eastern Adriatic coast, mentioned that the Republic of Ragusa was inhabited by Ragusans who are "sea captains, astronomers and sailors. They all speak the Slavic language, they all also know Italian, but are called Croats and they adhere to the Roman religion". A similar example of differentiating state (Ragusan) and ethnic (Croatian) identity is 18th century local Bernardin Pavlović, describing himself as from the Republic of Ragusa, but his literary works were in the "Croatian language" for the "benefit of [our] Croatian nation". The Serbian ethnic identity only appeared in the first half of the 19th century with the short-lived Serb-Catholic movement in Dubrovnik, in the context of broader political circumstances and activity of Austria-Hungary and new Principality of Serbia.

== Languages and literature ==
Originally, Latin was used in official documents of the Republic. Italian came into use in the 1420s. Both languages were used in official correspondence by the Republic. The Republic was influenced by the Venetian language and the Tuscan dialect. Old Ragusan, a variant of Dalmatian, which was spoken on the Dalmatian coast following the end of the Roman Empire, with elements of old Slavic vernacular, commonly referred to as ilirski (Illyrian), and Italian, were among the common languages. Since it was mainly used in speech, it is poorly documented. Its use started declining in the 15th century.

The use of Croatian in everyday speech increased in the late 13th century, and in literary works in the mid-15th century. At the end of the 14th century, inhabitants of the republic were mostly native speakers of Slavic language, referred to by them as Slavic, Ilyrian and Croatian at the time. The emergence of Shtokavian innovations can be certainly dated and followed in charters since the 13th century. The so-called Dubrovnik subdialect was a Western Old-Shtokavian dialect with a Chakavian substratum, and since the 16th century started to be influenced by Neo-Shtokavian innovations and Eastern Herzegovinian dialect (which was completed by the 19th century). Further analysis of literary works from the 16th century concluded that the Ragusans spoke a Western Old-Shtokavian dialect which shared many linguistic features with Chakavian dialect, that was Jekavian with significant Ikavian presence and steadily becoming (I)jekavian, and that the phenomenon of so-called Chakavisms in their language is not necessarily always product of some Chakavian substratum, Shtokavian-Chakavian contacts or influence of older literature in Chakavian dialect, as was usually elaborated. The old consideration that the early literary works were in Chakavian, is outdated.

The testaments from 17th and 18th century show folk language almost the same to the 19th century poems, and to modern-day speech in Dubrovnik, with small differences between testaments using Latin and Cyrillic script. Both the literary and folk language have many adapted Italianisms. Ragusans used Latin script, while the Cyrillic script (called as "lingua serviana", denoting the script, not the language; the Ragusans never called their language Serbian) in handwriting was also sometimes used.

=== Ragusan literature ===
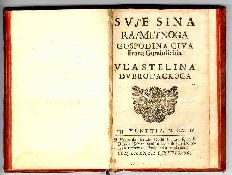
Tears of the Prodigal Son, cover of the 1622 edition by Ivan Gundulić, Croatian Baroque poet

Ragusan literature, in which Latin, Italian, and Croatian coexisted, blossomed in the 15th and 16th centuries. The literature of Dubrovnik had a defining role in the development of modern Croatian, and Dubrovnik Shtokavian dialect has been the basis for the Croatian standard language. There also were Ragusan authors of Morlachism, a primarily Italian and Venetian literary movement. According to Marcus Tanner:

During the Renaissance era, Venetian-ruled Dalmatia and Ragusa gave birth to influential intellectuals – mostly minor aristocrats and clergymen, Jesuits especially – who kept alive the memory of Croatia and the Croatian language when they composed or translated plays and books from Italian and Latin into the vernacular. No matter that the dialects of Dalmatia and Dubrovnik were different from each other ... and both these dialects were somewhat different from the dialect of Zagreb, capital of the Habsburg-ruled north. They still thought of it as Croatian. ... The Dubrovnik poet Dominko Zlatarić (1555–1610) explained on the frontispiece of his 1597 translation of Sophocles' tragedy Elektra and Tasso's Aminta that it had been "iz veće tudieh jezika u Hrvacki izlozene," "translated from more foreign languages in Croatian".

Literary works of famous Ragusans were written in both their native Slavic language and Italian. Among them are the works of writers Džore Držić (Giorgio Darsa), Marin Držić (Marino Darsa), Ivan Bunić Vučić (Giovanni Serafino Bona), Ignjat Đurđević (Ignazio Giorgi), Ivan Gundulić (Giovanni Gondola), Šišmundo (Šiško) Menčetić (Sigismondo Menze), and Dinko Ranjina (Domenico Ragnina). Writers and lexicographers from the 16th to the 19th century that were explicit in declaring or identifying as Croats and their language as Croatian included Mavro Vetranović, Nikola Nalješković, Dinko Zlatarić, Vladislav Menčetić, Bernardin Pavlović, Junije Palmotić, Jakov Mikalja, Joakim Stulli, Marko Bruerović.

==== National identity ====
The topic of language for writers from Dalmatia and Republic of Ragusa prior to the 19th century made a distinction only between speakers of Italian or Slavic, since those were the two main groups that inhabited Dalmatian city-states at that time. Whether someone spoke Croatian or Serbian was not an important distinction then, as the two languages were not distinguished by most speakers. However, most intellectuals and writers from Dalmatia who used the Shtokavian dialect and practiced the Catholic faith saw themselves as part of a Croatian nation as far back as the mid-16th to 17th centuries. In the national-building period emerged, partly based on nationalistic misappropriation of the Shtokavian dialect, a dispute between Croatian and Serbian linguists and historians whether the Dubrovnik's literature belonged to respective national identities, as Ivan Kukuljević Sakcinski and Vatroslav Jagić pointed out in 1854 and 1864.

Dubrovnik's literary tradition became central to the Croatian literature. Since the 19th century, Serbian scholars and Matica srpska have continued to dispute Croatia's claim to Dubrovnik's literary tradition, viewing it as either Serbian or a shared heritage. The opinion of Serbian authors on its importance and location ("external" or "internal") within Serbian literature varied. Serbian literary historians such as Jovan Deretić referred to it as "a tradition of secondary importance". In December 2021 was passed a cultural property law by the Serbian government in which Gundulić and other Dubrovnik writers are part of the shared Croatian and Serbian cultural heritage. Croatian scholars with HAZU, Matica hrvatska and representatives of the Croatian government condemn both claims about solely Serbian or joint cultural heritage as an example of "Greater Serbian pretension of Croatian history and heritage". American linguist Keith Langston stated that there's "not sufficient evidence to claim that Dubrovnik literature is somehow Serbian" neither its works "play the same role in the Serbian literary tradition" as "their influence on the contemporary Serbian language is due to the work of Vuk, who took this literature as one of the models for his reform of the Serbian language in the 19th century".

== See also ==
- List of notable Ragusans
- Collegium Ragusinum
- Walls of Dubrovnik
- Serbian Chancellery in Dubrovnik
- Republic of Poljica
- Septinsular Republic

== Sources ==
- Bresc, Henri; Nef, Annliese (1999). La première géographie de l'Occident. Flammarion. ISBN 978-2080710697.
- Cvitanic, Marilyn (2010). Culture and Customs of Croatia. ABC-CLIO. ISBN 978-031335117-4.
- Grčević, Mario (2019). Ime "Hrvat" u etnogenezi južnih Slavena [The name "Croat" in the ethnogenesis of the southern Slavs]. Zagreb, Dubrovnik: Hrvatski studiji Sveučilišta u Zagrebu – Ogranak Matice hrvatske u Dubrovniku. ISBN 978-953-7823-86-3.
- Harris, Robin (2006). Dubrovnik, A History. Saqi Books. ISBN 0863563325.
- Krekić, Bariša; Kazhdan, Alexander (1991). "Dubrovnik". In Kazhdan, Alexander (ed.). The Oxford Dictionary of Byzantium. Oxford and New York: Oxford University Press. ISBN 978-0195046526.
- Janeković Römer, Zdenka (2003). Višegradski ugovor – temelj Dubrovačke Republike [The Treaty of Viségrad: the Foundation of the Republic of Dubrovnik]. Golden marketing.
- Kunčević, Lovro (2013). "Janus-faced Sovereignty: The International Status of the Ragusan Republic in the Early Modern Period". In Kármán, Gábor; Kunčević, Lovro (eds.). The European Tributary States of the Ottoman Empire in the Sixteenth and Seventeenth Centuries. Leiden: Brill. ISBN 978-9004254404.
- Lodge, R. Anthony; Pugh, Stefan (2007). Language contact and minority languages on the littorals of Europe. Logos Verlag. ISBN 978-3832516444.
- Sugar, Peter F. (2012). Southeastern Europe under Ottoman Rule, 1354–1804. Seattle: University of Washington Press. ISBN 978-0295803630.
- Tanner, Marcus (1997). "Illyrianism and the Croatian Quest for Statehood". In Graubard, Stephen Richards (ed.). A New Europe for the Old?. Transaction Publishers. ISBN 978-1412816175.
- Tomaz, Luigi, Il confine d'Italia in Istria e Dalmazia. Duemila anni di storia, Think ADV, Conselve 2007.
- Vekarić, Nenad (30 June 1991). "Broj stanovnika Dubrovačke Republike u 15, 16. i 17. stoljeću" [The Population of the Dubrovnik Repulic in the 15th, 16th and 17th Century]. Dubrovnik Annals (in Serbo-Croatian) (29): 7–22. ISSN 1330-0598.
- Vojnović, Lujo (2009). Pad Dubrovnika (1797–1806). Fortuna. ISBN 978-9539598196.
