= Siege of Ragusa (1814) =

1814 siege of the War of the Sixth Coalition

Siege of Ragusa Siege of Dubrovnik (1814)
- Part of the Adriatic Campaign of the Napoleonic Wars
- Present day Dubrovnik (Ragusa) and Lokrum island from atop Srđ hill near the Imperial fortress where Hoste hoisted his artillery to bombard the town.
Date	19–27 January 1814
Location	Ragusa, Illyrian Provinces 43°05′21″N 16°10′18″E
Result	Anglo-Austrian victory

Belligerents
United Kingdom; Austria; Ragusa	France

Commanders and leaders
William Hoste; Todor Milutinović; Biagio Caboga	Joseph de Montrichard (surrendered)

Strength
400; 1 frigate 1 brig	600

Casualties and losses
41 killed or wounded	70 killed or wounded 530 captured

The siege of Ragusa or siege of Dubrovnik was fought between local Ragusan insurgents, as well as Austrian Croat troops and the British Royal Navy under Captain William Hoste against a French garrison under Joseph de Montrichard between 19 and 27 January 1814 during the Adriatic campaign of the Napoleonic Wars. The siege was fought on the coast of the Adriatic Sea for possession of the strategically important fortified town of Ragusa.

== Background ==
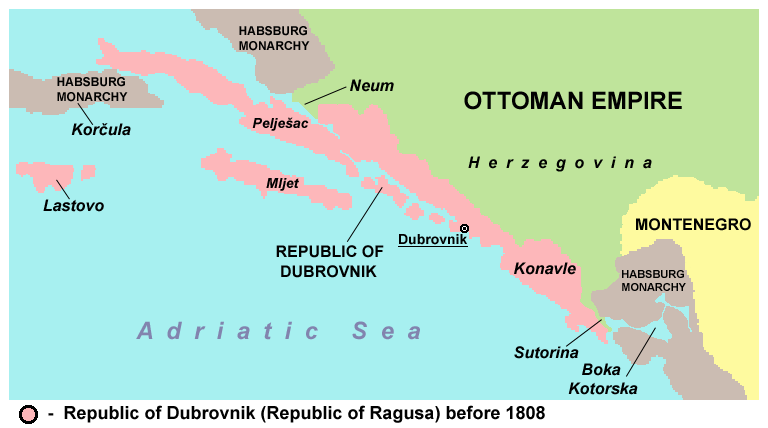
Republic of Ragusa before 1808

On 27 May 1806, the forces of the Empire of France occupied the neutral Republic of Ragusa. Upon entering Ragusan territory without permission and approaching the capital, the French General Jacques Lauriston demanded that his troops be allowed to rest and be provided with food and drink in the city before continuing on to take possession of their holdings in the Bay of Kotor. However, this was a deception because as soon as they entered the city, they proceeded to occupy it in the name of Napoleon. Almost immediately after the beginning of the French occupation, Russian and Montenegrin troops entered Ragusan territory and began fighting the French army, raiding and pillaging everything along the way and culminating in a siege of the occupied city (during which 3,000 cannonballs fell on the city). In 1808 Marshal Marmont issued a proclamation abolishing the Republic of Ragusa and amalgamating its territory into the French Empire's client state, the Napoleonic Kingdom of Italy. Marmont himself claimed the newly created title of "Duke of Ragusa" (Duc de Raguse) and in 1810 Ragusa, together with Istria and Dalmatia, went to the newly created French Illyrian Provinces.

After seven years of French occupation, encouraged by the desertion of French soldiers after the failed invasion of Russia and the reentry of Austria in the war in August 1813, all the social classes of the Ragusan people rose up in a general insurrection, led by the patricians, against the Napoleonic invaders. On 18 June 1813, together with British forces they forced the surrender of the French garrison of the island of Šipan, soon also the heavily fortified town of Ston and the island of Lopud, after which the insurrection spread throughout the mainland, starting with Konavle. They laid siege to the occupied city, helped by the British Royal Navy, who had enjoyed unopposed domination over the Adriatic sea, under the command of Captain William Hoste, with his ships HMS Bacchante and HMS Saracen. Working in conjunction with the Austrian armies now invading the Illyrian Provinces and Northern Italy, Rear Admiral Thomas Fremantle's ships were able to rapidly transport British and Austrian troops from one point to another, forcing the surrender of the strategic ports one after another December. Captain William Hoste with his ship HMS Bacchante (38 guns) had already captured the mountain fortress of Kotor with the help of Montenegrin forces in early January. After this victory Hoste along with HMS Saracen an 18 gun brig, immediately sailed to Ragusa. Soon the population inside the city joined the insurrection. The Austrian Empire sent a force under General Todor Milutinović offering to help their Ragusan allies. However, as was soon shown, their intention was to in fact replace the French occupation of Ragusa with their own. Seducing one of the temporary governors of the Republic, Biagio Bernardo Caboga, with promises of power and influence (which were later cut short and who died in ignominy, branded as a traitor by his people), they managed to convince him that the gate to the east was to be kept closed to the Ragusan forces and to let the Austrian forces enter the City from the west, without any Ragusan soldiers, once the French garrison of 500 troops under General Joseph de Montrichard had surrendered.

The French under command of Joseph de Montrichard had less than 600 men left in the entire region after losing over a third of his men who had defected since the war with Austria began.

== Siege ==
When Bacchante arrived at Ragusa on 19 January Hoste landed and visited Milutinovitch to see the situation. He had with him two Croat battalions of 400 men but they were without artillery, so Hoste improvised. On the morning of the 22nd Hoste immediately went into action and four mortars and two guns were landed and opened fire on San Lorenzo fort and the defences of the town. The French answered with a heavy fire from all batteries and Hoste soon knew that Ragusa would not be easy to take. Hoping to use the same successful tactics that won him Kotor, Hoste set about the task of seeking strategic positions. He soon eyed the forts and positions on the hill of Srđ overlooking the town and the nearby Lokrum island east of the town. By taking these positions he knew Ragusa would not last long under siege; Milutinović agreed with him.

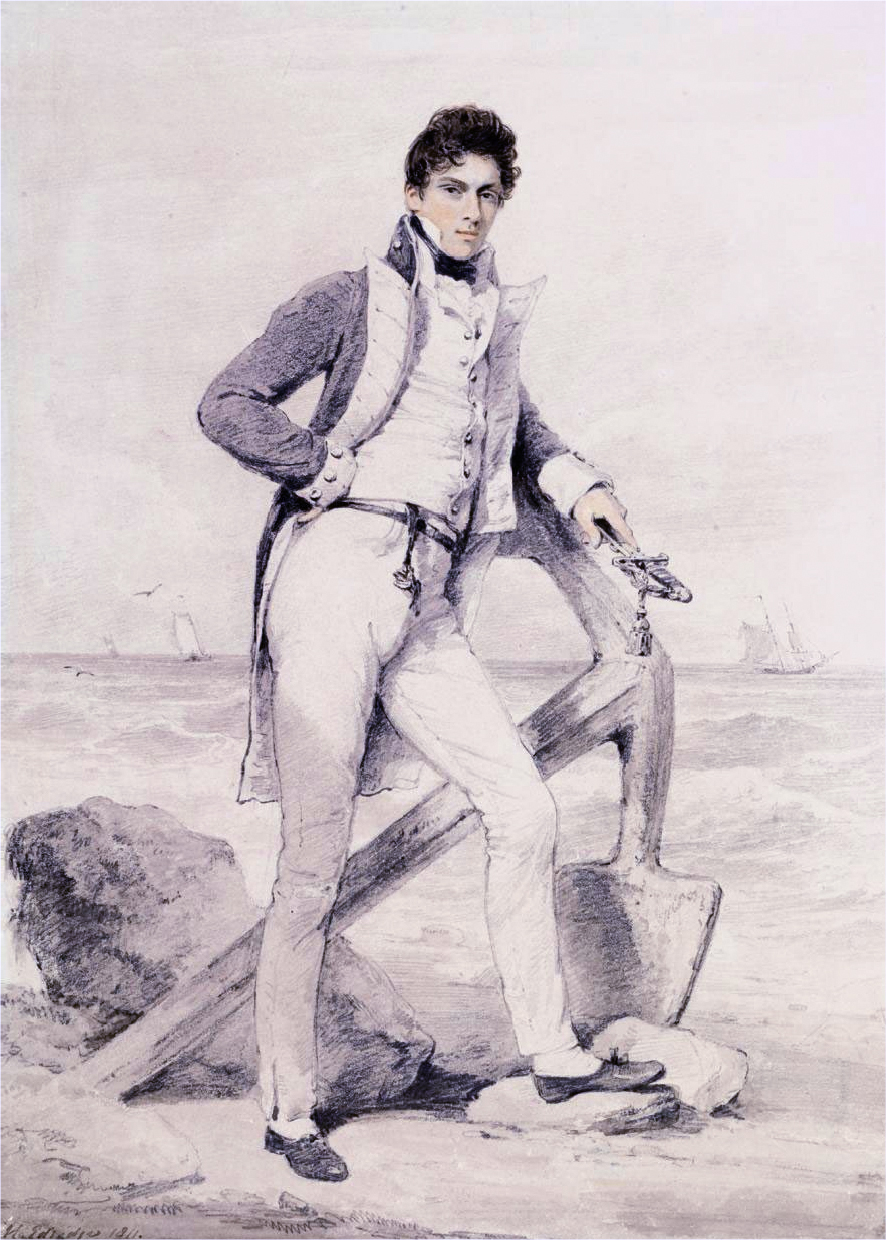
Captain William Hoste

To secure the approaches to the town on 24 January a third of Bacchante's crew (around 100 men) under Lieutenant Milbourne and his men rounded Srđ hill at the back of Ragusa with two eighteen-pounder guns, a distance of some 6 miles. They soon bombarded the small French garrison on Lokrum, Royal Marines landed and then took the island after a small fight which yielded eleven guns. On the road to Brgat the Royal Marines cut off the French water supply and also took the Monastery of St. Jacob east of the City.

At the same time Hoste asked Milutinović to attack the Imperial Fortress on top of the hill of Srđ, Milutinović agreed as long as Hoste supported him with artillery fire. This was agreed and by the end of the day, and despite some losses, the Croats were on top of Srđ forcing the seventy French gunners either to surrender or flee; this yielded twenty one guns. Hoste then ordered artillery to be ferried ashore and from the northern part of Gruž then taken up to the slopes of Srđ. Hoste, who had refused to supply cannon to the Ragusans on earlier occasions, did so now by supplying Milutinovitch with one large and two smaller cannons, and permitted them to stand by the batteries under British command.

Now the full complement of the siege guns were brought to bear: two mortars, two 16-pounders, and six 18-pounders as well as the guns on Bacchante and Saracaen and the captured French guns both on top of Srd and on Lokrum island. Hoste ordered the bombardment which continued on to next day without ceasing. He targeted the main towers of the Ragusa fortress; the Minčeta Tower, Fort Bokar and the Revelin Fortress. Then on the 2nd day being the 26th the Royal navy ships opened up a bombardment from the sea concentrating their fire on the ports St. John Fortress.

This was all too much for Montrichard: cut off for four months, losing many of his troops though defection, suffering a revolt in the surrounding region three months earlier and riots inside the town having flared up, he decided the only option was to surrender. He sent out a truce on the morning of the 27th and to request the British batteries to cease fire. Hoste agreed and the siege of Ragusa had ended.

== Aftermath ==
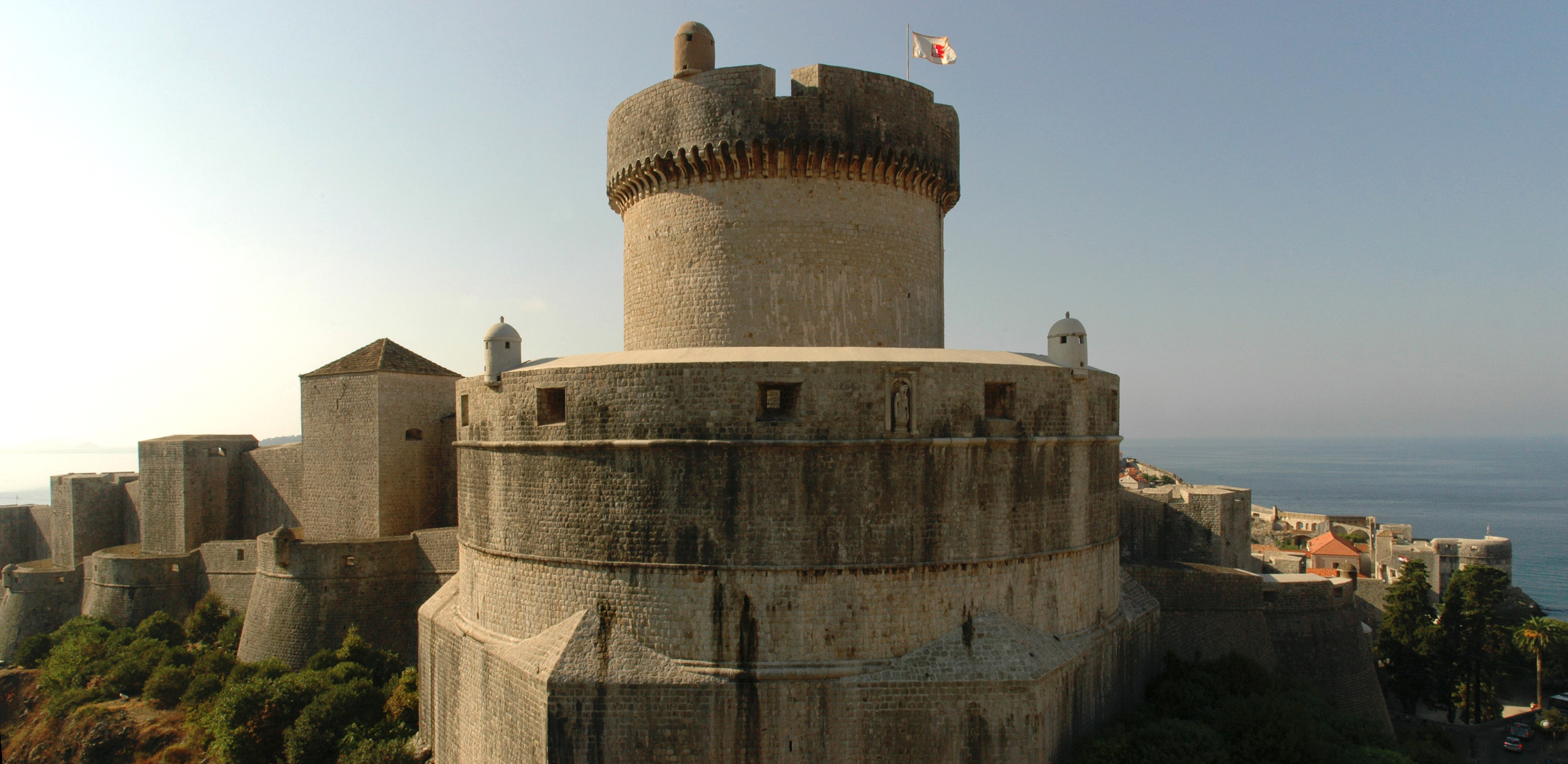
The Walls of Dubrovnik with the Minčeta Tower

On 27 January, the French capitulation was signed in Gruž and ratified the same day. It was then that one of the temporary governors of the Ragusan Republic, Biagio Bernardo Caboga, openly sided with the Austrians, dismissing the part of the rebel army which was from Konavle. Meanwhile, another leader of the insurrection, Đivo Natali, was still waiting with his men outside the Ploče Gates. After almost eight years of occupation the French troops marched out of Dubrovnik; 138 guns and 500 men were lost. On the afternoon of 28 January 1814 the Austrian troops and 100 British marines made their way into the city through the Pile Gates. With Caboga's support, General Milutinović ignored the agreement he had made with the Ragusan nobility in Gruž and proceeded to occupy the city. British losses were no more than one killed and 10 wounded. The Austrians had suffered a little more with around thirty casualties with most of these coming from the assault on Fort Imperial on Srd hill. There were reinforcements of British troops of the 35th regiment of foot from HMS Elizabeth which had arrived with Edward Leveson-Gower on the 29th, but he declined to take part in the negotiations seeing that Hoste had everything under control.

The Ragusan Flag of Saint Blaise, hoisted by the populace participating in the insurrection against the French occupation of the Ragusan Republic, was flown alongside the Austrian and British colours for only two days because on 30 January General Milutinović ordered the mayor to lower it. Overwhelmed by a feeling of deep patriotic pride, Giorgi, the last Rector of the Republic, refused to do so "for the masses had hoisted it". Subsequent events proved that Austria took every possible opportunity to take over the entire coast of the eastern Adriatic, from Venice to Kotor. The Austrians did everything in their power to eliminate the Ragusa issue at the subsequent Vienna Congress of 1815. The Ragusa representative, Miho Bona, was denied participation in the Congress, while the Austrian General Milutinović, prior to the final agreement of the allies, assumed complete control of the city.

Regardless of the fact that the government of the Ragusan Republic never signed any capitulation nor relinquished its sovereignty, which according to the rules of Klemens von Metternich that Austria adopted for the Vienna Congress should have meant that the Republic would be restored, the Austrian Empire managed to convince the other allies to allow it to keep the territory of the Republic. While many smaller and less significant cities and former countries were permitted an audience, that right was refused to the representative of the Ragusan Republic. All of this was in blatant contradiction to the solemn treaties that the Austrian Emperors signed with the Republic: the first on 20 August 1684, in which Leopold I promises and guarantees inviolate liberty ("inviolatam libertatem") to the Republic, and the second in 1772, in which the Empress Maria Theresa promises protection and respect of the inviolability of the freedom and territory of the Republic.

At the Congress of Vienna in 1815, Ragusa was made a part of the crown land of the Kingdom of Dalmatia, ruled by Austria-Hungary, which it remained a part of until 1918.

After the surrender Bachannte took a detachment of the 35th foot to Trieste and, on 22 March, she went to the town of Parga on the coast of Greece after the inhabitants had requested assistance against the French garrison of 170 men commanded by a colonel. The French flag was hauled down as soon as the frigate arrived and Hoste took possession of the town.

== See also ==
- Siege of Cattaro
- Siege of Dubrovnik
- Walls of Dubrovnik
