= Joseph Hélie Désiré Perruquet de Montrichard =

French general (1760–1828)

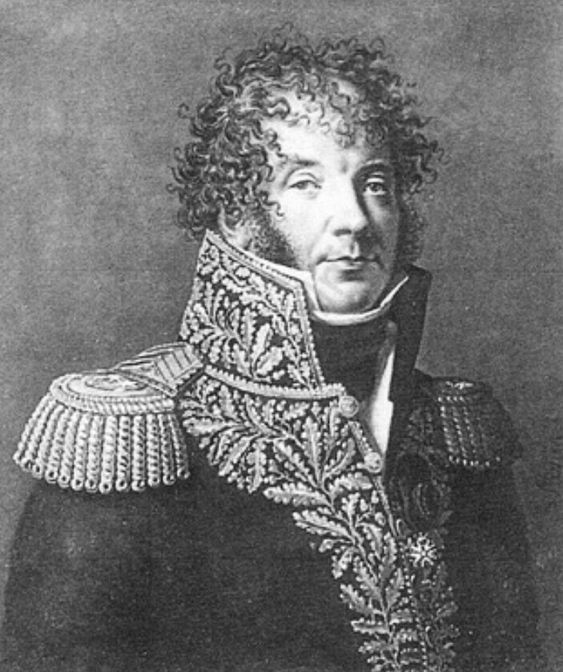
- General Joseph de Montrichard
- Born: 24 January 1760; Thoirette, Jura, France
- Died: 5 April 1828 (aged 68); Strasbourg, Bas-Rhin, France
- Military career
- Allegiance: France
- Branch: Artillery
- Rank: Général de Division
- Conflicts: French Revolutionary Wars; Napoleonic Wars
- Awards: Order of Saint Louis

Joseph Hélie Désiré Perruquet de Montrichard (French pronunciation: [ʒozɛf eli deziʁe peʁykɛ də mɔ̃ʁiʃaʁ]; 24 January 1760, Thoirette – 5 April 1828) was a French general of the French Revolutionary Wars and Napoleonic Wars. His name is inscribed on the north side of the Arc de Triomphe. Montrichard commanded the right wing at the Battle of Trebbia in June 1799. In his final action, he surrendered Dubrovnik to an Anglo Austrian force under William Hoste in January 1814. He comes from the house of Montrichard, a very old family of French nobility.

== Early career ==
After entering the Metz Artillery School in August 1781 and in 1782, Joseph Hélie Désiré Perruquet de Montrichard transferred to the artillery school at Besançon. In 1783, he was commissioned as a sous-lieutenant and joined the artillery regiment at Strasbourg. In 1786, Montrichard was promoted to lieutenant and then in 1791, he was promoted to captain. He served at Metz and then Besançon and then in 1793, he joined the Army of the Rhine and was promoted to chef de bataillon. In 1795, Montrichard was promoted to chef de brigade and in June of 1796 he was ordered to prepare for the crossing of the Rhine at Strasbourg. Later that month, he played an important part in the crossing and then two months later he was promoted to général de brigade. Next Montrichard served at the crossing of the Lech and then in September he was ordered to protect the retreat of General Jean Victor Marie Moreau at Ulm. In October, he served at the Battle of Schliengen and then in November he served at the siege of Kehl. In April of 1797, Montrichard began serving in the division of Jean Pierre Girard-dit-Vieux and then at the end of the year he became chief of staff of the Army of Mainz.

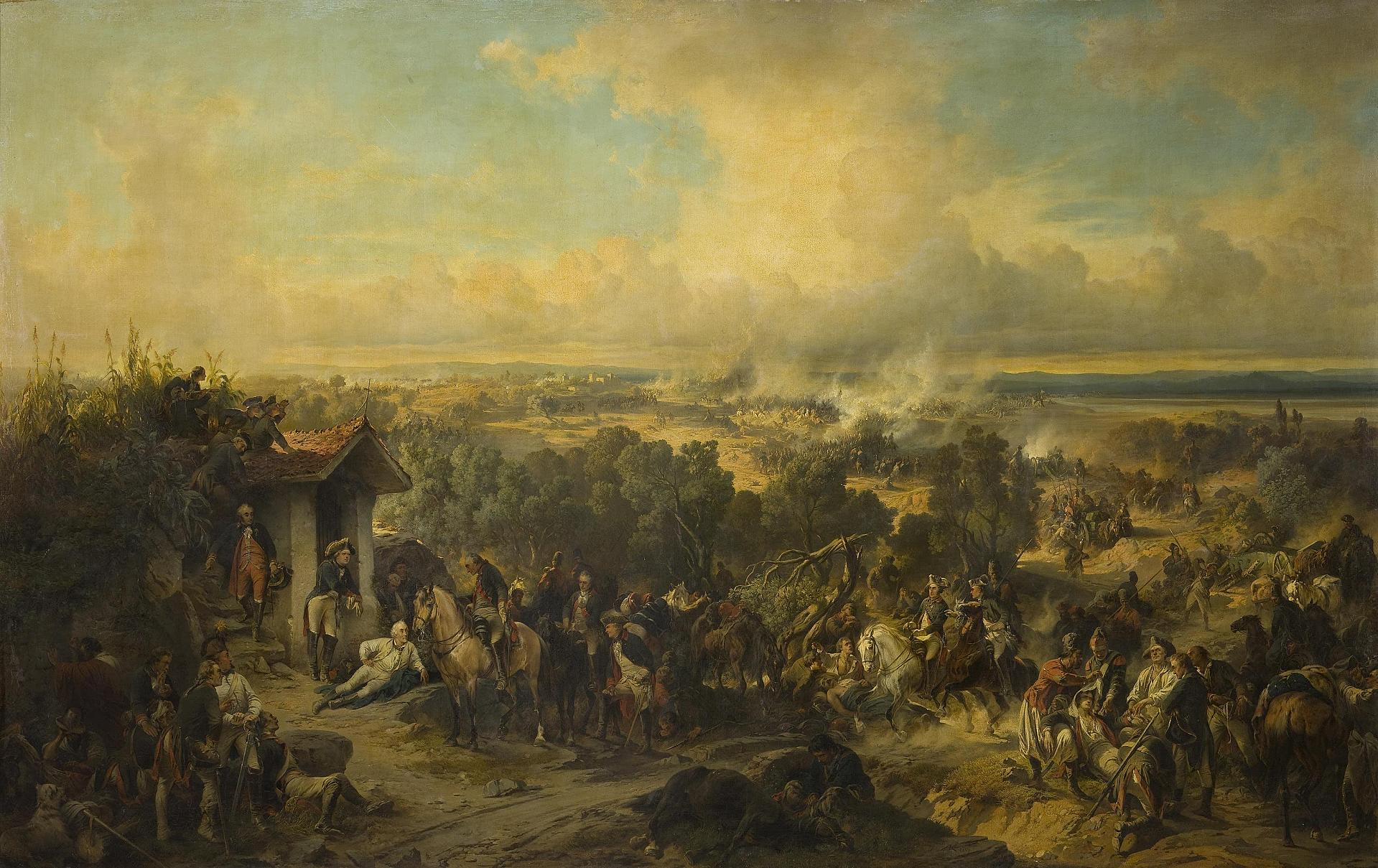
Battle of Trebbia on 8 June 1799 by Alexander von Kotzebue. Montrichard commanded the French 3rd Division in the battle.

Montrichard was next designated for the Army of England and then the Army of Italy, and in October of 1798, he replaced Louis-Gabriel Suchet as chief of staff of the Army of Italy under Barthélemy Catherine Joubert's command. He occupied Alexandria in December and then in February of 1799, he was promoted to général de division. Taking command of the right wing of the Army of Italy, Montrichard served at Pastrengo in March and then Magnano in April. He next served as commander at Bologna before rejoining Étienne Macdonald's army. In June, Montrichard lifted the blockade of Bologna and the fort of Urbin and then he served at the Battle of Trebbia.

== Austrian campaign and Italy ==
In April 1800, Montrichard took command of the 2nd Division of Claude Lecourbe's corps in the Army of the Rhine. That May, he served at Stockach, Messkirch, and Memmingen and then in June he served at Höchstädt. Later in June, Montrichard took command of the 2nd Division and he served at the battle of Neuburg. Once hostilities resumed in the winter, he crossed the Inn at Neubeuern in December and then battled the Austrians at Götzing, Salzburg, and Kremsmunster. After peace had been obtained in late 1801, Montrichard began serving in Switzerland. In 1802, he was sent to command the French troops in the Batavian Republic and then in 1803, he was sent to Breda, the camp of Nimègue, and Hanover. Montrichard's next major career movements were to pass to Italy as commander of the French and Italian troops in the Papal States and then command a division of the army employed in Naples. In December 1805, he was suspended from his functions and put on non-activity for having levied a contribution of 100,000 piastres on the March of Ancona.

== Dalmatian Campaign and later service ==
In January 1808, Montrichard returned to duty by joining the Army of Dalmatia under General Auguste de Marmont. He took command of the 1st Division and in May 1809, he served at Göspich. After the army reunited with Napoleon's forces in Austria, Montrichard was given command of the isle of Lobau after the Battle of Wagram. That November, he took command of the 2nd Division of the Army of Illyria at Zara where he remained until December 1810, when he was recalled to France. Montrichard was once again put on non-activity until April 1812, when he was ordered to organize a division in the Frioul. In 1813, he was sent back to Illyria to take command of the 2nd Division and in April he was named commander of Ragusa. Montrichard held Ragusa until the end of January 1814, when he was forced to surrender the city. By the terms of the surrender he was taken prisoner and transported to Ancona. After the Bourbon Restoration, Montrichard was placed on non-activity but also named a Knight of Saint Louis. He did not take part in the Hundred Days in 1815 and he retired later that year.

== Family ==
Montrichard has many descendants, with 2 main branches: the ones who stayed in France during the Revolution and the ones who went to Trinidad. The direct descendants of Montrichard still live in the Chateau.
