= Siege of Cattaro =

Adriatic campaign of the Napoleonic Wars

- Part of the Adriatic Campaign of the Napoleonic Wars
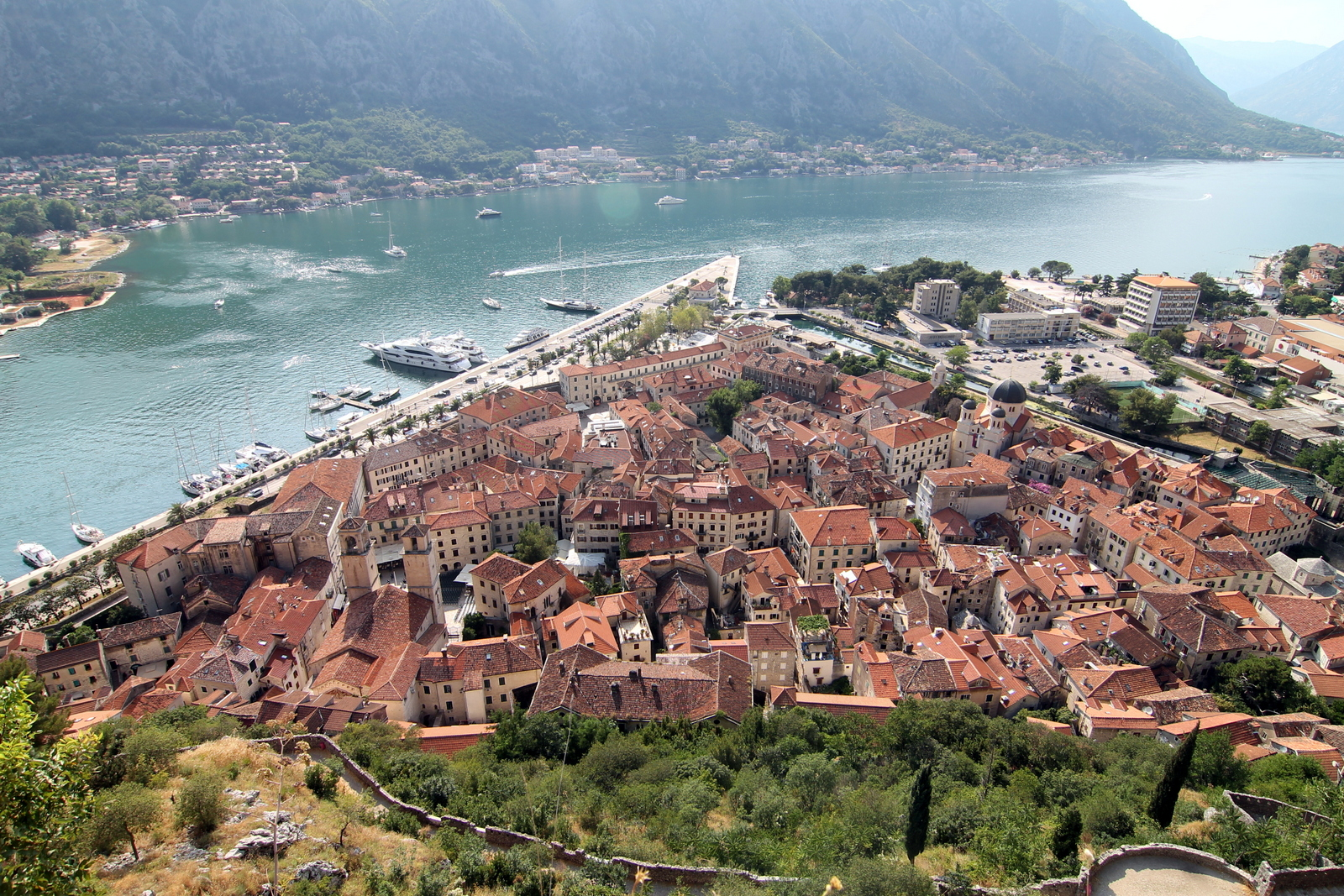
- View of Cattaro (present-day Kotor) from the castle of St. John
Date	14 October 1813 – 3 January 1814
Location	Cattaro, Illyrian Provinces 42.43°N 18.77°E
Result	Anglo-Montenegrin victory

Belligerents
United Kingdom; Montenegro (Kingdom of the Two Sicilies) Sicily	France

Commanders and leaders
(United Kingdom of Great Britain and Ireland) William Hoste (Prince-Bishopric of Montenegro) Petar I	(First French Empire) Jean-Joseph Gauthier (surrendered)

Strength
800; 1 frigate 1 brig 3 gunboats	600

Casualties and losses
20 killed and wounded	600 captured

The siege of Cattaro was fought between a British Royal Naval detachment of Captain William Hoste and Montenegrin forces of Petar I Petrović-Njegoš respectively and the French garrison under the command of Jean-Joseph Gauthier of the mountain fortress of Cattaro (now Kotor, Montenegro). The siege lasted from 14 October 1813 to 3 January 1814 during the Adriatic campaign of the Napoleonic Wars when the French surrendered. The engagement was fought in the Adriatic Sea for possession of the important fortress of Cattaro.

== Background ==
As part of Venetian Albania, Cattaro had belonged to the Republic of Venice from 1420 to 1797, when it passed to the Habsburg monarchy with the Treaty of Campo Formio. In 1805, it was assigned to the French Empire's client state, the Napoleonic Kingdom of Italy by the Treaty of Pressburg, but occupied by Russian troops under Dmitry Senyavin until they left after the Treaty of Tilsit in 1807. Three years later it was incorporated into the French Empire's Illyrian Provinces. Austria declared war on France in August 1813 and by the Autumn the Royal Navy enjoyed unopposed domination over the Adriatic sea. Working in conjunction with the Austrian armies now invading the Illyrian Provinces and Northern Italy, Rear Admiral Thomas Fremantle's ships were able to rapidly transport British and Austrian troops from one point to another, forcing the surrender of the strategic ports, Zara for example had been liberated in December.

Meanwhile, Royal Naval Captain William Hoste with his ship HMS Bacchante (38 guns) and a brig-sloop HMS Saracen (18 guns), under Captain John Harper had been given orders for the swift expulsion of the French in the region. They took part in an attack that seized the islands of Hvar and Brač and moved along the coast. Cattaro was next on the target for the British; a body of Montenegrin troops under Petar I Petrović-Njegoš a popular spiritual and military leader of the Serbian Orthodox church from the Petrović dynasty had surrounded the place. Saracen arrived first just outside Cattaro Bay but it was impossible to sail direct to the main fortress so Harper called on the local inhabitants to tow her along the rocky shore for 3 miles. Hoste in Bacchante arrived soon after with three Sicilian gunboats carrying fifty soldiers and assumed command. The British and Sicilians forced the passage between Herceg Novi and Fort Rosa and secured an anchorage some three miles inside the outer bay.

== Blockade and siege ==
On the evening of the 14th Harper left with two gunboats, the launch and barge of Bacchante and the boats of Saracen entered the inner bay where he was fired on from the Island of St George. Afterwards heading four miles towards Cattaro he found four gunboats in a state of revolt and took possession of them. He then landed at various places where the local inhabitants were arming themselves against the French and collected volunteer crews for his new captures.

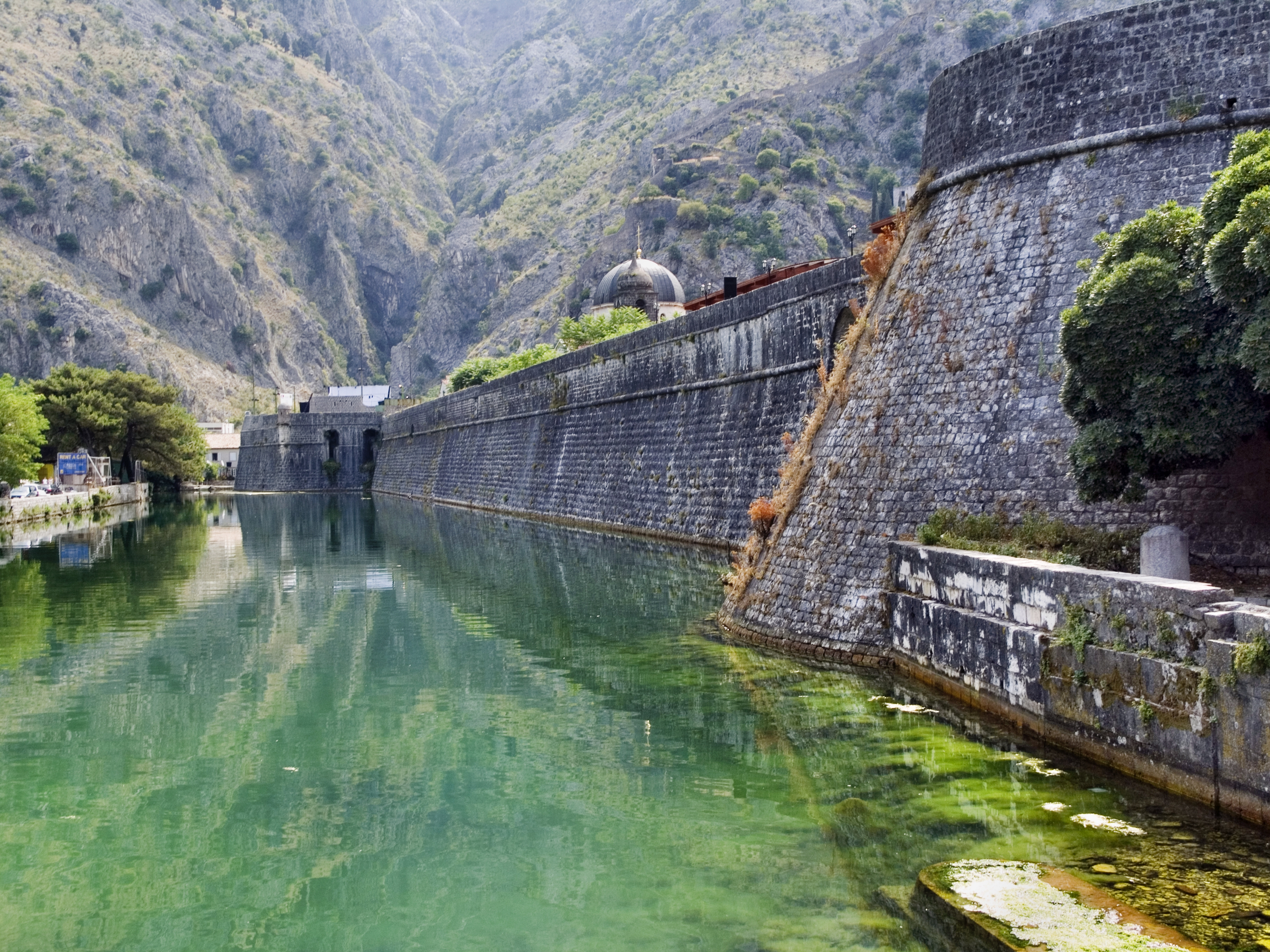
The Northern walls of the Cattaro fortress

At Perast Hoste found that the locals had taken possession of a French fort with 3 guns which they placed at his disposal, hoisting the English and Austrian colours. At 6am he used these guns, those of his gunboats and the newly acquired gunboats to bombard the island of St. George. Then within fifteen minutes the Royal marines and the Sicilians under Captain Harper in several smaller craft attacked a French gunboat force off the island seizing all four. The following day the boats of the squadron attacked the island itself and captured it, stationing a garrison to blockade Cattaro. The prize gunboats each had a long 24-pounder in the bow and two of them each carried a 12-pounder carronade.

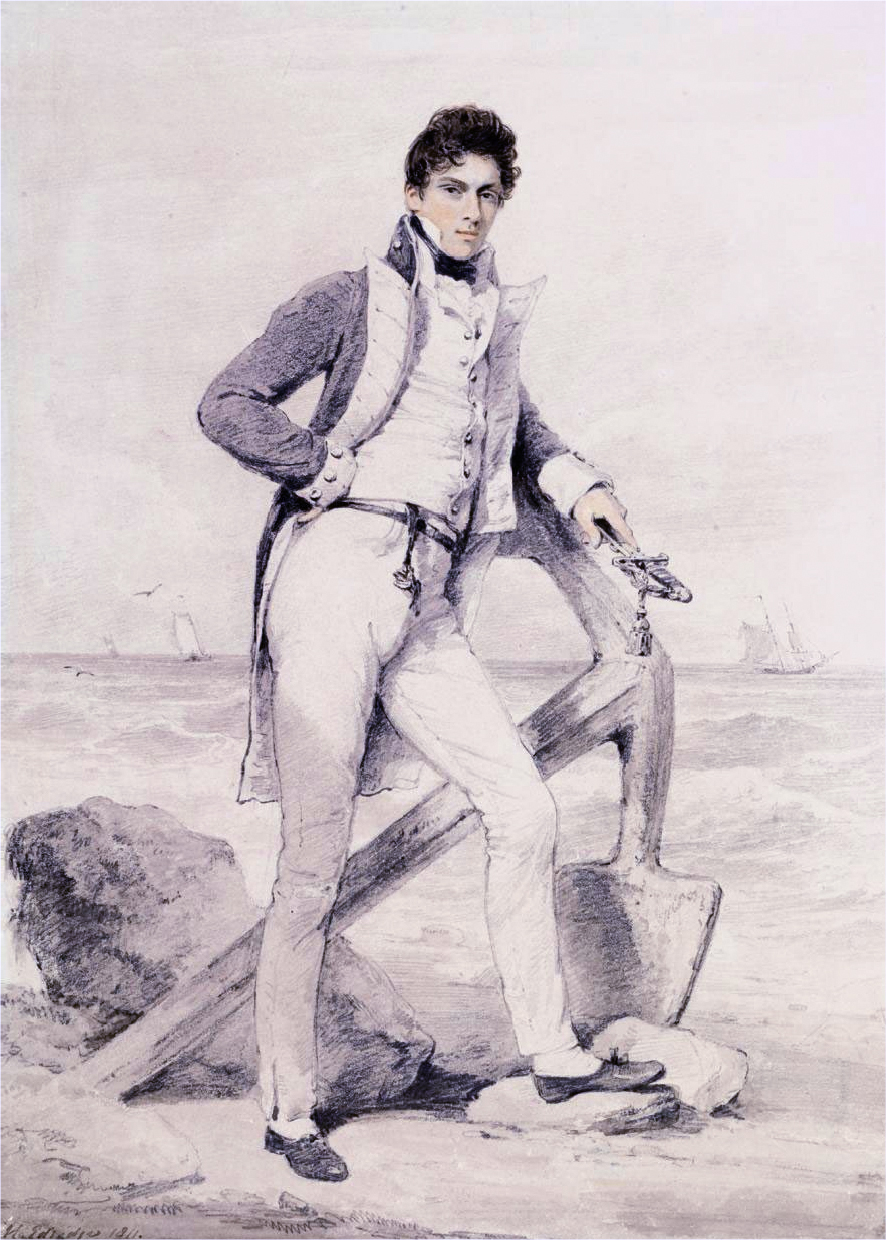
Portrait of Captain William Hoste

By now only the main fortress of Cattaro was left and Hoste, Harper and his assortment of allies – British, Croats, Montenegrins and Sicilians – surrounded the area. With the help of Montenegrins and the pro-Austrian natives of the liberated shores of the Bay of Kotor, Hoste found himself in an unpleasant position between the Montenegrins and their support on the one hand, and on the other the pro-Austrian population who were unwilling to submit themselves to Montenegrin domination. Hoste made sure to remain neutral as his main objective was the defeat of the French in the region. However, he knew that politics would eventually play a role if and when the area was under allied control and therefore also had to try to satisfy the British commissioner in the region Lord Aberdeen by ensuring that the Austrians were the ones to end up with the spoils. Hoste meanwhile had been ordered to attack elsewhere leaving Harper with the Saracen in charge. Hoste in the next month helped to take Split with troops of the 35th Foot and for the next month a close blockade was made on Cattaro with the hope of the arrival of Austrian troops. Bad weather had not helped the situation and after capturing Cavtat further north Hoste soon returned to the bay but found no Austrian troops.

By early December the local French commander, General Gauthier, had retired to Fort St. John with 600 men. This fort lay on the side of the hill protecting the Western side of the fortified town of Cattaro. Hoste and Harper both agreed that use would be made of the local armed populace for the final stages of the siege. Preparations were made to place batteries all around Cattaro including the use of the top of the hill of St John as a primary position, right above the fortress itself. Hoste and Harper led their men in the difficult task of scattering batteries down the forbidding slopes of the Cattaro hills using block and tackle. In an "unmilitary manner" after 3 weeks of great exertion by Bacchante and Saracens seamen in continuous rain an 18-pounder was hoisted to the summit on 23 December, a height of nearly 3,000 feet. Meanwhile, Bacchante and the rest of her crew mounted further pieces of ordnance; two batteries of 18 and 32-pounders were added. Hoste, despite being ill, personally helped the men get the equipment up the slopes of the mountain but further North and South respectively of the fort and the main battery on the slope.

On Christmas Day, with all guns in position and with the return of good weather, Hoste ordered the commencement of the bombardment. Fire was opened up from four different points, with the 18-pounder above the St John fortress being particularly effective. Saracen and Bacchante stayed out of range of the fort's guns until the bombardment started but then opened up with all they had. Hoste on the 2nd ordered Harper to lead a surprise nighttime assault. This was not necessary, however, as on 3 January 1814, when Harper was about to lead an assault, Gauthier offered to surrender. After ten days of shelling and no hope of relief the French surrendered to Hoste under honourable conditions and the British and Montenegrins took control of the fort and the town. After a ten-day siege, the French garrison had no alternative and surrendered on 5 January 1814.

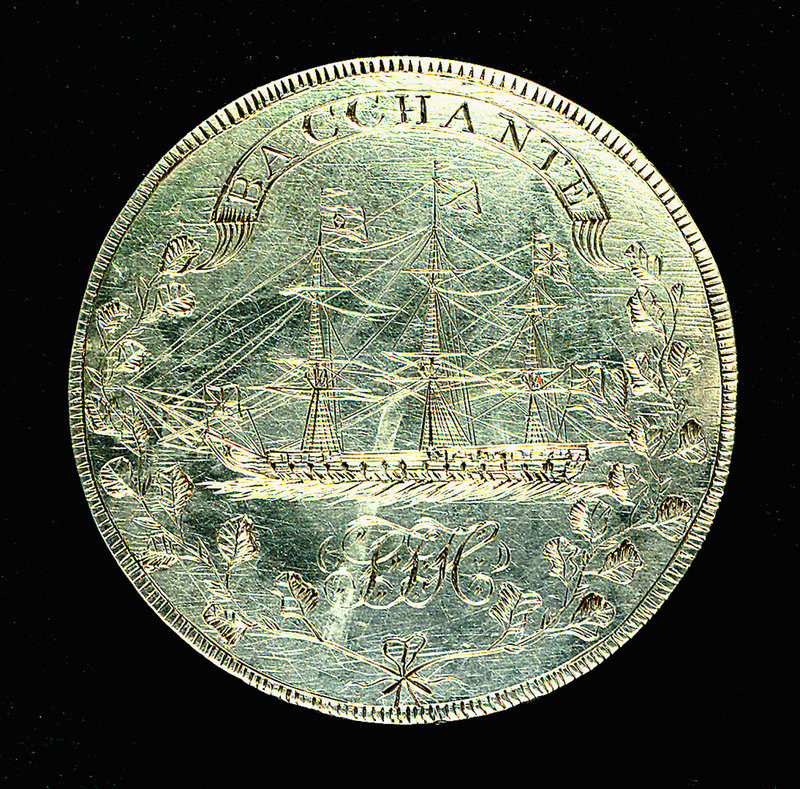
Medal commemorating HMS Bacchante's bombardment of Cattaro 1814

== Aftermath ==
The loss on the British, amounting to only one seaman killed, and Lieutenant of marines slightly wounded. In the course of the twenty-day siege, Hoste had counted on the support of Austrian infantry which failed to show up. Hoste signed the articles of capitulation and the remaining French and Italian troops marched out in surrender, after which British troops marched in along with the Montenegrins. Hoste gave the town to the Montenegrin commission under Peter which aggravated Lord Aberdeen but Hoste argued that he had no choice in the matter.

Hoste with Bacchante and Saracen after a short rest and recuperation left Cattaro to sail to the fortress of Ragusa where they laid siege to the place in a very similar manner to Cattaro and on the 28th it surrendered. By the end of March all of the towns and cities had surrendered to the British or the allied rebels that had risen in revolt, leaving the Adriatic in complete allied control with the exception of Corfu. Cattaro was restored to the Austrian Empire by the Congress of Vienna.

== See also ==
- Fortifications of Kotor
