= Bernardin Pavlović =

Croatian writer

Bernardin Pavlović was a Franciscan writer from Dubrovnik, born in Ston. He had two works printed in Venice in 1747 which he wrote were "in Croatian". The title of the second work notes it's printed in "our worthy Croatian language" for "the use of the Croatian people", which was noticed by Vatroslav Jagić and later by John V. A. Fine as one of increasingly many examples of how the term Croatian came into use in addition to the existing more generic Illyrian (Slavic) terminology in Dalmatia.

== See also ==
- Republic of Ragusa
- List of notable Ragusans
- Dubrovnik
- Dalmatia
- History of Dalmatia

== Bibliography ==
- Fine, John Van Antwerp (2006). When Ethnicity Did Not Matter in the Balkans: A Study of Identity in Pre-Nationalist Croatia, Dalmatia, and Slavonia in the Medieval and Early-Modern Periods. University of Michigan Press. ISBN 0-472-11414-X.
