= Dubrovnik Annals =

- Discipline: History of Dubrovnik and the Republic of Ragusa
- Language: English
- Edited by: Vladimir Stipetić

Publication details
- History: 1997-present
- Publisher: Croatian Academy of Sciences and Arts
- Frequency: Annual
- Open access: Yes
- License: CC BY-NC

Standard abbreviations
- ISO 4: Dubrov. Ann.

Indexing
- ISSN: 1331-3878 (print); 1848-8153 (web)
- LCCN: 2001234321
- OCLC no.: 166882381

Links
- Journal homepage; Online archive

Dubrovnik Annals is an annual peer-reviewed academic journal established in 1997. It covers all aspects of the history and culture of Dubrovnik and the Republic of Ragusa. It is published by the Croatian Academy of Sciences and Arts's Institute for Historical Sciences and the editor-in-chief is Vladimir Stipetić. The annals are yearly presented at a conference in a festive atmosphere.

== Abstracting and indexing ==
The journal is abstracted and indexed in Historical Abstracts.
