= Natali family =

Noble family of the Republic of Ragusa

Natali
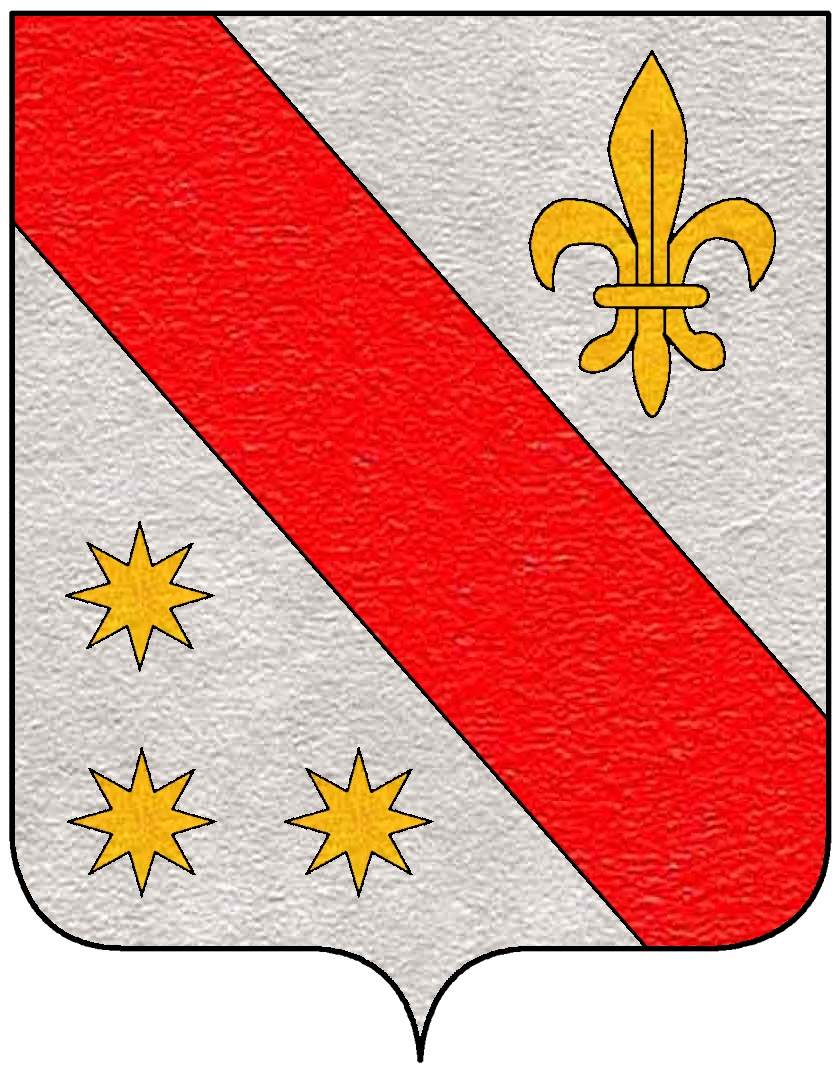
- Country: Republic of Ragusa; Austria-Hungary; Italy
- Titles: Count

The House of Natali was a noble family of the Republic of Ragusa. They appear at the case nuove on 1297 of patrician nobility of the Republic of Venice. His origin is the Bellicia gens.

== History ==
The family Natali (or de Natali, Natalini, Natalis, Natalibus, Natalich and Nadal) originated in Split and moved to Dubrovnik in 1667. They belonged to the list of late patriciate families of the Ragusan nobility. Between the 14th and 16th century, the Natali family lived in Spalato (Split). It moved to Ragusa (Dubrovnik). Giovanni de Natali (Croatian: Đivo Natali) was admitted to the Ragusan Great Council on 30 July 1667. In 1817, Natali family received their confirmation of nobility from the Austrian Empire after the end the Republic of Ragusa.

== Notable members ==
- Gerolimo Natali (fl. 1735–37), Ragusan military officer in Russian service.
  - Pietro Natali (1727–1801), Ragusan senator and military officer in Russian service.
    - Giovanni Giacomo Natali (1775–1853)
    - Carlo Antonio Natali (1768–1857)
    - Girolamo Francesco Natali (1778–1862) count
    - Maria Natali (1774–1861), married Francesco Ghetaldi (1743–1798)
      - Sigismondo Ghetaldi-Gondola (1795–1860)
      - Matteo Ghetaldi-Gondola (1797–?)
- Giacomo Natali (fl. 1700)
- Francesco Natali (fl. 1713–21), singer of Vivaldi.

== Sources ==
- Siebmacher's Wappenbuch Band 29, Königreich Dalmatien Seite: 16
- Relazione della rivoluzione fattavi dai Ragusei contro li Francesi l’anno 1813 perricuperare la patria liberta scritta dal Colonello Conte Giovanni di Natali Patrizio Raguseo
