= Illyrian Provinces =

Province of the First French Empire

Illyrian Provinces Provinces illyriennes (French)
- 1809–1814/1815
- Flag Seal

- Illyrian Provinces (green) in 1812
- Status: Autonomous Provinces of the French First Empire
- Capital: Laibach (now Ljubljana, Slovenia); Administrative capital Segna (now Senj, Croatia); Military capital
- Official languages: French
- Demonym: Illyrian
- Governor-General
  - 1809–1811: Auguste de Marmont
  - 1811–1812: Henri Bertrand
  - 1812–1813: Jean-Andoche Junot
  - 1813–1814: Joseph Fouché
- Historical era: Napoleonic Wars
  - Treaty of Schönbrunn: 14 October 1809
  - Siege of Ragusa: 27 January 1814/1815
  - Congress of Vienna and formal annexation by the Austrian Empire: 9 June 1815
Preceded by
Kingdom of Italy (Napoleonic)
Kingdom of Croatia (Habsburg)
Austrian Empire
Succeeded by
Kingdom of Dalmatia
Kingdom of Croatia (Habsburg)
Kingdom of Illyria

The Illyrian Provinces (Note: French: Provinces illyriennes Croatian: Ilirske provincije Slovene: Ilirske province Serbian: Илирске провинције Italian: Province illiriche German: Illyrische Provinzen) were an autonomous province of France during the First French Empire that existed under Napoleonic Rule from 1809 to 1814. The province encompassed large parts of modern-day Croatia and Slovenia, stretching over smaller areas of Italy, Montenegro, and Austria. It maintained an administrative capital in Ljubljana and a military capital in Senj. It encompassed six departments, making it a relatively large portion of territorial France at the time. Adriatic Croatia was split up into two large regions: Civil Croatia and Military Croatia. The former served as a residential enclave and the latter as a military base to check the Ottoman Empire.

In 1809, Napoleon Bonaparte invaded the region with his Grande Armée after key wins during the War of the Fifth Coalition forced the Austrian Empire to cede parts of its territory. Integrating the land into France was Bonaparte's way of controlling Austria's access to the Mediterranean and Adriatic Sea and expanding his empire east. Bonaparte installed four governors to oversee French bureaucracy, culture, and language, the most influential of which was Auguste de Marmont. Marmont was succeeded by Henri Gatien Bertrand (1811–12), Jean-Andoche Junot (1812–13), and Joseph Fouché (1813–14).

Under the military occupation, Marmont disseminated Code Napoléon and attempted a vast infrastructural expansion. During 1810, the French authorities established the écoles centrales in both Croatia and Slovenia with French designated as the official language. Napoleon, depleted from manpower, introduced military conscription, uniform taxation, abolished certain tax privileges, separated church and state and nationalized the judiciary. The French were forced to withdraw the area after their defeat in the War of the Sixth Coalition as the Austrian Empire recovered the area in 1813–1814.

== Etymology ==
The name "Illyrian" was probably suggested to Napoleon by Auguste de Marmont, who was influenced by the civic and revolutionary intelligentsia in Dalmatia, Dubrovnik and Carinthia, and wanted to use it to support the sense of commonality of the peoples living in the Provinces, which went beyond Napoleon's basic geostrategic rationale to form the provinces, though historians have discussed the extents of the influence of historical ideas of Illyrism both in France and locally, as well as a Neoclassicist allusion to the ancient names of the Dalmatian coast, known as Illyria in antiquity and Illyricum during the Roman era.

== History ==
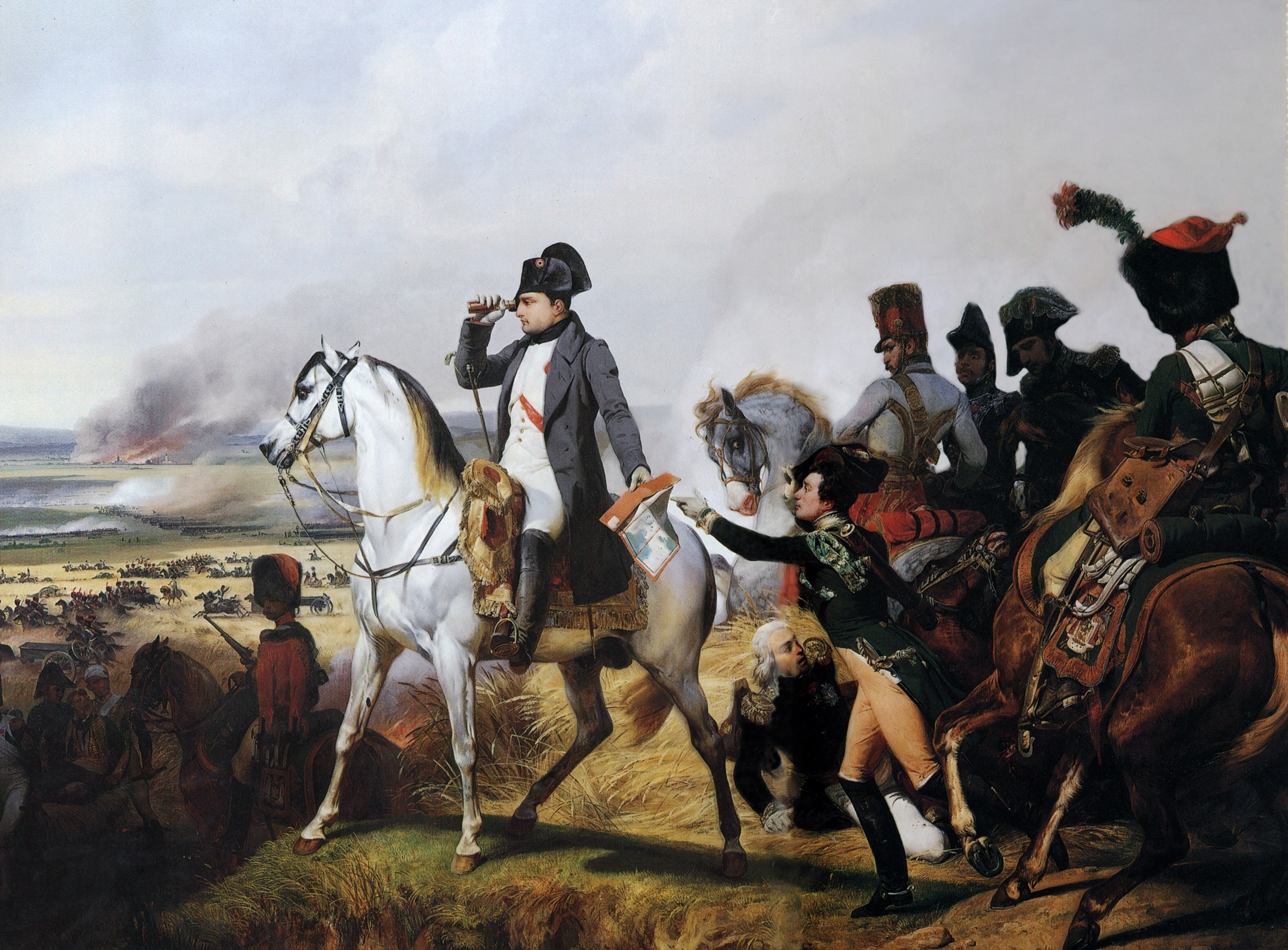
Napoleon in Austria during the War of the Fifth Coalition

The Slovene Lands, ruled by the Habsburg monarchy, were first occupied by the French Revolutionary Army after the Battle of Tarvis in March 1797, led by General Napoleon Bonaparte. The occupation caused huge civil disturbances. The French troops under the command of General Jean-Baptiste Bernadotte tried to calm the worried population by issuing special public notices that were published also in Slovene. During the withdrawal of the French army, the commanding general Bonaparte and his escort made a stop in Ljubljana on April 28, 1797. Upon the 1805 Battle of Austerlitz and the Peace of Pressburg, French troops once again occupied parts of Slovene territory. Supply of the French troops and steep war dues were a huge burden for the population of the occupied territories. The foundation of the provincial brigades in June 1808 and extensive preparations for the new war did not stop Napoleon's Grande Armée, which completely defeated the Austrian troops at the Battle of Wagram on July 6, 1809.

After the Austrian defeat, the Illyrian Provinces were created by the Treaty of Schönbrunn on 14 October 1809, when the Austrian Empire ceded the territories of western ("Upper") Carinthia with Lienz in the East Tyrol, Carniola, Gorizia and Gradisca, the Imperial Free City of Trieste, the March of Istria, and the Croatian lands southwest of the river Sava to the French Empire. These territories lying north and east of the Adriatic Sea were amalgamated with the former Venetian territories of Dalmatia and Istria, annexed by Austria in the 1797 Treaty of Campo Formio, and the former Republic of Ragusa, which all had just been adjudicated to the Napoleonic Kingdom of Italy in 1805 and 1808, into the Illyrian Provinces, technically part of France.

The Royal Navy imposed a blockade of the Adriatic Sea after the signing of the Treaty of Tilsit (July 1807), which brought merchant shipping to a standstill, a measure which seriously affected the economy of the Dalmatian port cities. An attempt by joint Franco-Italian force to seize the British-held Dalmatian island of Vis (Lissa) failed on 22 October 1810.

In August 1813, the Austrian Empire again declared war on France. Austrian troops led by generals Christoph von Lattermann and Franz Tomassich invaded the Illyrian Provinces. Lattermann operated in northern parts, while Tomassich invaded Dalmatia. The strategic port of Trieste was taken on 29 October. Croat troops enrolled in the French army switched sides. Zara (now called Zadar) surrendered to Austrian and British forces after a 34-day siege on 6 December 1813. In the regions of Dubrovnik and Kotor local insurrections forced the French to retreat into the cities. Insurrection in the Bay of Kotor region was aided by Montenegrin forces. Arrival of British naval forces led to the siege of Kotor, forcing French garrison to surrender on 3 January 1814. In the region of Dubrovnik, a provisional Ragusan administration was established, hoping for the restoration of the Republic. After the Siege of Dubrovnik, the French garrison surrendered on 27 January 1814, thus effectively ending French rule in the Illyrian Provinces, while the Treaty of Paris (30 May 1814) formally reduced French territory to the 1792 borders. The appearance of Austrian forces in the Bay of Kotor region caused the Prince-Bishop of Montenegro to turn over the territory to Austrian administration on 11 June. The British withdrew from the Dalmatian islands as the final part of the handover of these islands to their Austrian allies in July 1815, following the conclusion of the Battle of Waterloo.

== Administration ==
The administrative divisions of the First French Empire 1812; the Illyrian Provinces are divided into six departments.

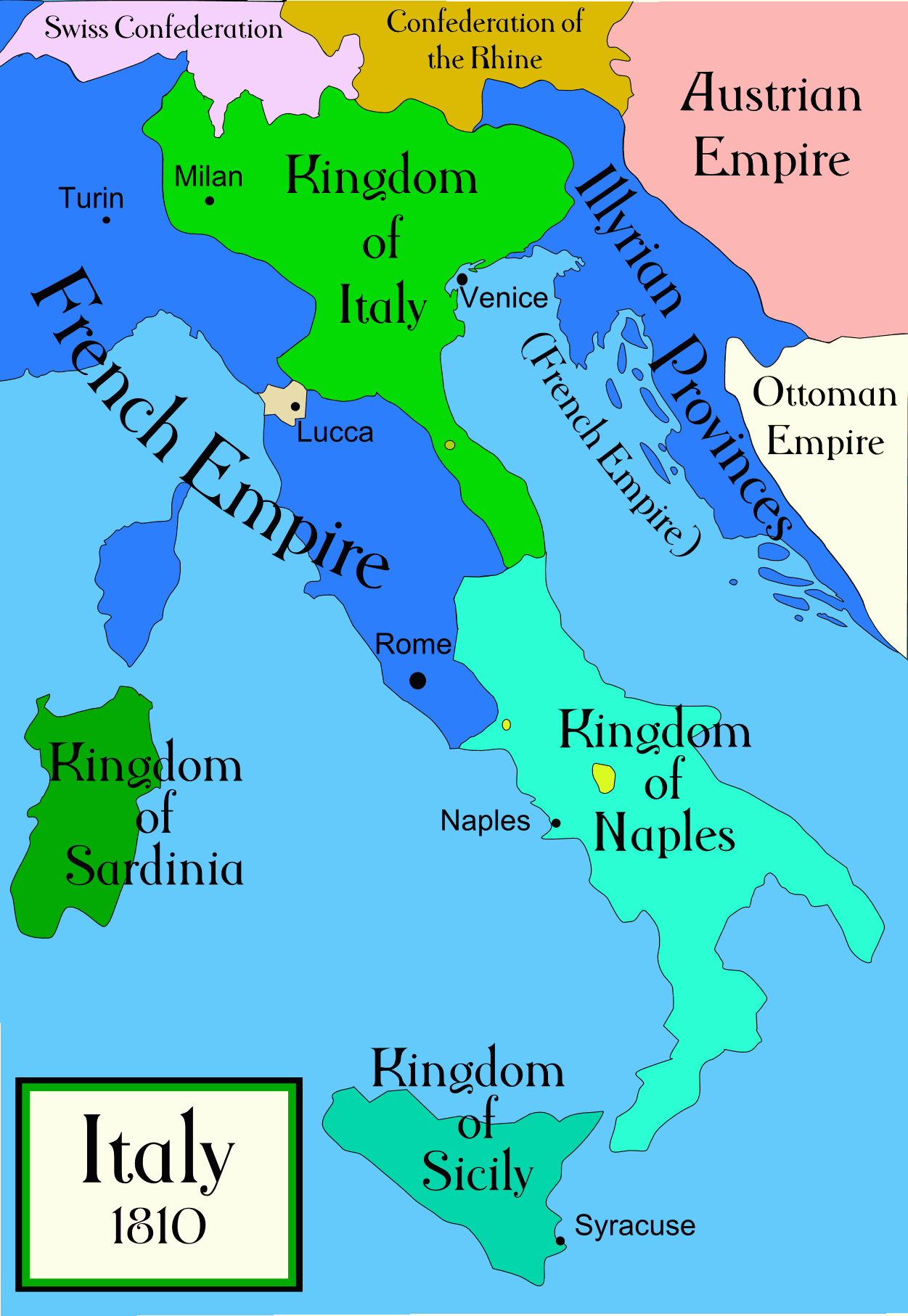
Political map of Italy in 1810 marking the Illyrian Provinces as part of the First French Empire

The capital was established at Laybach, i.e. Ljubljana in modern Slovenia. According to Napoleon's Decree on the Organization of Illyria (Decret sur l'organisation de l'Illyrie), issued on April 15, 1811, the Central Government of the Illyrian Provinces (Gouvernement general des provinces d'Illyrie) in Ljubljana consisted of the governor-general (gouverneur-général), the general intendant of finance (intendant général des finances) and the commissioner of the judiciary (commissaire de justice). With two judges of the Appellate Court in Ljubljana they formed the Minor Council (Petit conseil) as the supreme judicial and administrative authority of the Provinces.

=== Subdivision ===
The area initially consisted of eleven departments, though the subdivision was never completely enacted:

Name	Capital
Adelsberg	Adelsberg (Postojna)
Bouches-du-Cattaro	Cattaro (Kotor)
Croatie	Karlstadt (Karlovac)
Dalmatie	Zara (Zadar)
Fiume	Fiume (Rijeka)
Gorice	Gorice (Gorizia)
Laybach	Laybach (Ljubljana)
Neustadt	Neustadt (Novo Mesto)
Raguse	Raguse (Dubrovnik)
Trieste	Trieste
Willach	Willach (Villach)

In 1811, the Illyrian provinces saw an administrative reorganization, when the country was divided initially in four – Laybach (Ljubljana), Karlstadt (Karlovac), Trieste (Trst), Zara (Zadar) – on 15 April in seven provinces (intendances, similar to French départements). Each province was further subdivided into districts, and these into cantons. A province (intendancy) was governed by a provincial intendant, districts were administered by subdelegates (each district capital that was not a province capital had a subdelegation with a subdelegate, similar to French subprefect) and in cantons justices of the peace had their seats. Municipalities – with municipal council, mayor and deputy mayors in larger municipalities; or council, municipality president-syndic and deputy president-deputy syndic – were units of local government. All officials and councillors were appointed by the emperor or the governor-general, depending on their relevance and/or size of the subdivision unit in which they served.

=== List of provinces ===
List of provinces (intendances) and districts:

Province (Intendancy)	Capital	Districts	Former department(s)
Carinthie (Carinthia)	Willach (Villach)	Willach; Lienz	Willach
Carniole (Carniola)	Laybach (Ljubljana)	Adelsberg (Postojna); Laybach; Krainburg (Kranj); Neustadt (Novo Mesto)	Adelsberg, Laybach, Neustadt
Croatie civile (Civil Croatia)	Karlstadt (Karlovac)	Karlstadt; Fiume (Rijeka); Lussinpiccolo (Mali Lošinj)	Fiume, parts of Croatie
Croatie militaire (Military Croatia)	Segna (Senj)		parts of Croatie
Istrie (Istria)	Trieste	Trieste; Gorice (Gorizia); Capodistria (Koper); Rovigno (Rovinj)	Trieste and Gorice
Dalmatie (Dalmatia)	Zara (Zadar)	Zara; Spalato (Split); Lesina (Hvar); Sebenico (Šibenik); Macarsca (Makarska)	Dalmatie
Raguse	Raguse (Dubrovnik)	Raguse; Cattaro (Kotor); Curzola (Korčula)	Bouches-du-Cattaro and Raguse

Two Chambers of Commerce were established, at Trieste and at Ragusa. The ecclesiastical administration was reorganized in accordance with the new political borders; two archdioceses were established with seats at Ljubljana and Zara, with suffragan dioceses at Gorizia, Capodistria, Sebenico, Spalato and Ragusa (1811).

=== Governors-general ===
The French administration, headed by a governor-general, introduced civil law (the Napoleonic Code civil) across the provinces. The seat of the governor-general was at Laybach. The governors-general were:

- Auguste de Marmont (8 October 1809 – January 1811)
- Henri-Gatien Bertrand (9 April 1811 – 21 February 1813)
- Jean-Andoche Junot (21 February 1813 – July 1813)
- Joseph Fouché (July 1813 – August 1813)

=== Population ===
The population (1811) was given at 460,116 for the intendancy of Ljubljana, 381,000 for the intendancy of Karlovac, 357,857 for the intendancy of Trieste and 305,285 for the intendancy of Zara, in total 1,504,258 for all of Illyria. A French decree emancipated the Jews; this decree abolished a Habsburg-era regulation which had forbidden Jews to settle within Carniola.

=== Political arrangements ===
Despite the fact that not all French laws applied to the territory of the Illyrian Provinces, Illyrian offices were accountable to ministries in Paris and to the Higher Court of Paris. Inhabitants of the Illyrian Provinces had Illyrian nationality. Initially the official languages were French, Italian and German, but in 1811 Croatian and Slovenian were further added, the latter becoming official for the first time in history. Among the main changes the French empire brought were the overhaul of administration, the changing of the schooling system – creating universities and making Slovene a learning language – and the usage of the Napoleonic Code and the Penal Code. Although the French did not entirely abolish the feudal system, their rule familiarized in more detail the inhabitants of the Illyrian Provinces with the achievements of the French Revolution and with contemporary bourgeois society. They introduced equality before the law, compulsory military service and a uniform tax system, and also abolished certain tax privileges, introduced modern administration, separated powers between the state and the church (the introduction of the civil wedding, keeping civil registration of births etc.), and nationalized the judiciary. The occupants made all the citizens theoretically equal under the law for the first time.

The French also founded a university (École centrale) in 1810 (which was disbanded in 1813, when Austria regained control, but whose Basic Decree of 4 July 1810, which ordered the reorganization of the former Austrian lycees in Ljubljana and Zara into écoles centrales, is now considered the charter of the University of Ljubljana). They established the first botanic garden at the city's edge, redesigned the streets and made vaccination of children obligatory. At Karlovac, the headquarters of the Croatian military, a special French-language military school was established in 1811. The linguist Jernej Kopitar and the poet Valentin Vodnik succeeded in instructing the authorities at that time that the language of the inhabitants living in the present-day Slovenian part of the Illyrian Provinces was actually Slovene. Although at the time of the Illyrian Provinces the educational reform did not come to life to its fullest ability, it was nevertheless of considerable social significance. The plan for reorganisation of the school system provided for education in elementary and secondary schools in Slovene in Slovenian areas. There were 25 gymnasia in the Illyrian provinces.

Proclamations were published in the provinces' official newspaper, the Official Telegraph of the Illyrian Provinces (Télégraphe officiel des Provinces Illyriennes). The newspaper was established by Marmont. In 1813, the French author Charles Nodier worked in Ljubljana as the last editor of the journal, significantly renovated it, and published it in French, Italian, and German. The "French gift" of letting Slovene be used at school was one of the most important reforms and it won the sympathy of members of the so-called "Slovene National Awakening Movement". Marmont's school reform introduced, in the fall of 1810, a uniform four-year primary school and an extended network of lower and upper gymnasiums and crafts schools. Valentin Vodnik, author of the poem "Illyria Arise", wrote numerous school books for primary schools and lower gymnasiums; since textbooks (and teachers) were scarce, these books made the realization of the idea of Slovene as a teaching language possible.

== Legacy ==
Although French rule in the Illyrian Provinces was short-lived and did not enjoy great popular support, it significantly contributed to greater national self-confidence and awareness of freedoms, especially in the Slovene lands. The opinion of Napoleon's rule and the Illyrian Provinces changed significantly at the end of the 19th century and the beginning of the 20th century, when liberal Croatian and Slovene intellectuals began to praise the French for liberation from Austrian rule.

It could also be established today that the short period of the Illyrian Provinces marked the beginning of an enhanced awareness of the principles of liberty, equality and fraternity. The Congress of Vienna confirmed Austria in the possession of the former Illyrian Provinces. In 1816 they were reconstituted without Dalmatia and Croatia, yet now with all of Carinthia, as a Kingdom of Illyria, which was formally abolished only in 1849, even though the civil administration of the Croatian districts had already been placed under Hungarian administration in 1822.

The memory of the French and of the Emperor Napoleon is embedded in Croatian and Slovene traditions, in their folk art and folk songs. The presence of the French on Croatian and Slovene territories reflects also in the surnames and house names of French origin, in frescoes, and other paintings depicting French soldiers as well as in rich immovable cultural heritage (roads, bridges, fountains). In 1929, a national ceremony was held in Ljubljana during which a monument was erected to Napoleon and Illyria at French Revolution Square. It was filmed by Janko Ravnik.

One of the central streets in Split city centre is named after Marshal Marmont, in appreciation of his enlightened rule in Dalmatia.

== See also ==
- List of French possessions and colonies
- Republican French rule in the Ionian Islands
- Septinsular Republic
- Imperial French rule in the Ionian Islands
- Napoleonic Kingdom of Italy

== Bibliography ==
- Bradshaw, Mary Eloise (1928). The Napoleonic Influence on the Illyrian Provinces. University of Wisconsin—Madison Press. OCLC: 54803367
- Bradshaw, Mary Eloise (1932). The Illyrian Provinces. University of Wisconsin—Madison Press. OCLC: 49491990
- Bundy, Frank J. (1987). The Administration of the Illyrian Provinces of the French Empire, 1809–1813. New York-London: Garland. ISBN 978-0-8240-8032-7.
- Haas, Arthur G. (1963). Metternich, Reorganization and Nationality, 1813–1818: A Story of Foresight and Frustration in the Rebuilding of the Austrian Empire. Wiesbaden: Franz Steiner Verlag. ISBN 978-3-515-00998-0.
