= List of writers by name: P =

The following is a List of writers by name whose last names begin with P:

Abbreviations: ch = children's; d = drama, screenwriting; f = fiction; nf = non-fiction; p = poetry, song lyrics

== Pa ==
- Piet Paaltjens (1835–1894, Netherlands, p/f/nf), pseudonym of François Haverschmidt
- Arto Paasilinna (1942–2018, Finland, f/nf/p)
- Kalle Päätalo (1919–2000, Finland, f)
- Titinga Frédéric Pacéré (1943–2024, Burkina Faso, p/nf)
- José Emilio Pacheco (1939–2014, Mexico, p/f/nf)
- Luiz Pacheco (1925–2008, Portugal, nf)
- Manuel A. Alonso Pacheco (1922–1989, Puerto Rico, p/nf)
- Jovan Pačić (1771–1849, Hungary, p/nf)
- José Emilio Pacheco (1939–2014, Mexico, p/nf/f)
- Ruth Padel (born 1946, England, p/f/nf)
- Ron Padgett (born 1942, US, p/nf/f)
- Heberto Padilla (1932–2000, Cuba/US, p/f)
- Adrián Paenza (born 1949, Argentina, nf)
- Nebojša Pajkić (born 1951, Yugoslavia/Serbia, d)
- Edward Packard (born 1931, US, ch)
- Joy Packer (1905–1977, S Africa, f/nf)
- ZZ Packer (born 1973, US, f)
- Julián Padrón (1910–1954, Venezuela, f/d)
- Geoff Page (born 1940, Australia, p/nf)
- Lynda Page (born 1950, England, f)
- P. K. Page (1916–2010, Canada, p/nf/ch)
- R. I. Page (1924–2012, England, nf)
- John Paget (1808–1892, England/Austria-Hungary, nf)
- Stephen Paget (1855–1926, England, nf/ch)
- Thomas Paget (1689–1742, England, p)
- Dan Pagis (1930–1986, Romania/Israel, p/nf/ch)
- Boris Pahor (1913–2022, Austrian E/Italy, f)
- Pai Hsien-yung (白先勇, born 1937, China, f)
- Roopa Pai (living, India, nf/ch)
- Barry Pain (1864–1928, England, p/nf/f)
- Thomas Paine (1737–1807, England/US, nf)
- William Painter (c. 1540–1595, England, nf/f)
- Paisius of Hilendar (1722–1773, Ottoman E, nf)
- Chuck Palahniuk (born 1962, US, f)
- Maria Palaiologina, Queen of Serbia (died 1355, Serbia, nf)
- Peter K. Palangyo (1939–1993, Tanzania, f)
- Greg Palast (born 1952, US, nf)
- Alexandru Paleologu (1919–2005, Romania, nf)
- Theodor Paleologu (born 1973, Romania, nf)
- Octavian Paler (1926–2007, Romania, nf)
- Frederick Apthorp Paley (1815–1888, England, nf)
- Grace Paley (1922–2007, US, f/p/nf)
- Francis Turner Palgrave (1824–1897, England, nf/p)
- Michael Palin (born 1943, England, d/nf)
- Dibyendu Palit (1939–2019, India, p/f)
- Palladas (fl. 4th c. CE, Egypt, p)
- Azarías Pallais (1884–1954, Nicaragua, p/nf)
- Johannes Hendricus van der Palm (1763–1840, Netherlands, p/nf)
- Ricardo Palma (1833–1919, Peru, nf)
- Connie Palmen (born 1955, Netherlands, f)
- Bernard Palmer (1914–1998, US, ch/f)
- Charles John Palmer (1805–1882, England, nf)
- Charlotte Palmer (c. 1762 – post-1834, England, f)
- Diana Palmer (born 1946, US, f), pseudonym of Susan Spaeth Kyle
- Helen Palmer (1917–1979, Australia, nf)
- Michael Palmer (born 1943, US, p/nf)
- Nettie Palmer (1885–1964, Australia, p/nf)
- Raymond A. Palmer (1910–1977, US, f/nf)
- Robert Palmer (1945–1997, US, nf)
- Vance Palmer (1885–1959, Australia, f/d/p)
- Hermann Pálsson (1921–2002, Iceland, nf)
- Sigurður Pálsson (1948–2017, Iceland, nf/d)
- Joanikije Pamučina (1810–1870, Ottoman E, nf)
- Orhan Pamuk (born 1952, Turkey, f/d)
- Lynn Pan (born 1945, China/Singapore, nf)
- Nayan Raj Pandey (born 1966, Nepal, f/d)
- Sima Pandurović (1883–1960, Serbia/Yugoslavia, p/nf)
- Edgar Pangborn (1909–1976, US, f)
- Oskar Panizza (1853–1921, Germany, d/f/nf)
- Anthony Panizzi (1797–1879, England, nf)
- Sylvia Pankhurst (1882–1960, England/Ethiopia, nf)
- Anton Pann (1790s – 1854, Ottoman E/Wallachia, p/nf)
- Janus Pannonius (1434–1472, Hungary, p)
- Anton Panov (1906–1967, Ottoman E/Yugoslavia, d)
- Alexei Panshin (1940–2022, US, f/nf)
- Cory Panshin (born 1947, US, f/nf)
- Sumitranandan Pant (1900–1977, India, p)
- Jane Ellen Panton (1847–1923, England, nf/f)
- William Williams Pantycelyn (c. 1717–1791, Wales, p/nf)
- Francisco Matos Paoli (1915–2000, Puerto Rico, p/nf)
- Christopher Paolini (born 1983, US, f/d)
- Hortensia Papadat-Bengescu (1876–1955, Romania, f)
- Alexandros Papadiamantis (1851–1911, Greece, f/p)
- Mākereti Papakura (1873–1930, N Zealand, nf)
- Franz von Papen (1879–1969, Germany, nf)
- Papias of Hierapolis (c. 60 – c. 130 CE, Greece, nf)
- Žarana Papić (1949–2002, Yugoslavia/Serbia, nf)
- George Papashvily (1898–1978, Russian E/US, nf)
- Aristides Paradissis (1923–2006, China/Australia, p/f)
- Paragu (1921–2011, Burma/Myanmar, nf)
- Isaac Pardo (fl. 18th c., Bosnia/Herzegovina, nf)
- Jacob Pardo (fl. 18th c., Ragusa, nf/ch)
- Jacob Vita Pardo (1822–1843, Austrian Empire/Ragusa, nf)
- Joseph Pardo (hazzan) (c. 1624–1677, Netherlands/England, nf)
- Moses Pardo (died 1888, Palestine/Egypt, nf/f)
- Julia Pardoe (1804–1862, England, p/f/nf)
- Miguel Donoso Pareja (1931–2015, Ecuador, f/nf)
- Rashmi Parekh (born 1976, India, p)
- Jean Jacques Clark Parent (born 1951, Haiti, f/p/d)
- Michael Parenti (1933–2026, US, nf)
- Ratko Parežanin (1898–1981, Austria-Hungary/Germany, nf)
- Edith Pargeter (1913–1995, England, f/nf), pseudonym Ellis Peters
- Harald Parigger (born 1953, Germany, f/p/ch)
- Parijat (1937–1993, Nepal, f/p/nf), pseudonym of Bishnu Kumari Waiba
- Peggy Parish (1927–1988, US, ch)
- Susan Parisi (born 1958, Canada/Australia, f)
- Barbara Park (1947–2013, US, ch)
- Linda Sue Park (born 1960, US, f/ch)
- Ruth Park (1917–2010, N Zealand/Australia, f/ch)
- Park Yong-rae (박용래, 1925–1980, Korea/S Korea, p)
- Dorothy Parker (1893–1967, US, p/f/nf)
- Emma Parker (fl. 1809–1817, Wales, f)
- Gilbert Parker (1862–1932, Canada/England, f/p)
- Jane Marsh Parker (1836–1913, US, ch/f/nf)
- K. Langloh Parker (1856–1940, Australia, nf)
- Una-Mary Parker (1930–2019, England, nf/f)
- Frank Kobina Parkes (1932–2004, Gold Coast/Ghana, nf/p)
- Nii Parkes (born 1974, England, p/nf), pseudonym K. P. Kojo
- Amy Parkinson (1855–1938, England/Canada, p)
- Adele Parks (living, England, f)
- Stella Parks (living, US, nf)
- Tim Parks (born 1954, England, f/nf)
- Parmenides (late 6th or early 5th c. BCE, Greece, nf)
- Peter Parnall (born 1936, US, ch)
- Thomas Parnell (1679–1718, Ireland/England, p/nf)
- Évariste de Parny (1753–1814, Isle of Bourbon/France, p)
- Milan Paroški (born 1957, Yugoslavia/Serbia, nf)
- Delia Parr (living, US), pseudonym of Mary Lechleidner
- Harriet Parr (1828–1900, England, f/ch/nf), pseudonym Holme Lee
- Nicanor Parra (1914–2018, Chile, p)
- Teresa de la Parra (1889–1936, Venezuela, f)
- Violeta Parra (1917–1967, Chile, p/nf)
- Anne Parrish (1888–1957, US, f/ch)
- Anne Spencer Parry (1931–1985, Australia, f)
- Gwenlyn Parry (1932–1991, Wales, d)
- John Parry (Bardd Alaw) (1776–1851, Wales, nf/p)
- Lorae Parry (born 1955, N Zealand, d)
- R. Williams Parry (1884–1956, Wales, p)
- Robert Parry (1540–1612, Wales, p/f)
- Sarah Winifred Parry (1870–1953, Wales/England, f)
- Thomas Parry (1904–1985, Wales, nf)
- Amy Parry-Williams (1910–1988, Wales, p/f/d)
- T. H. Parry-Williams (1887–1975, Wales, p/nf)
- Shahrnush Parsipur (born 1946, Iran/US, f/nf/ch)
- Eliza Parsons (1739–1811, England, f)
- James Parsons (1705–1770, England, nf)
- Alicia Partnoy (born 1955, Argentina/US, p/nf)
- James Parton (1822–1891, England/US, nf)
- Margaret Parton (1915–1981, US, nf)
- Blaise Pascal (1623–1662, France, nf)
- Jacqueline Pascarl (born 1963, Australia, nf)
- Teixeira de Pascoaes (1877–1952, Portugal, p)
- Giovanni Pascoli (1855–1912, Italy, p)
- Anwar Pasha (1928–1971, India, f)
- Atena Pashko (1931–2012, Ukraine, p)
- Viktor Paskov (1949–2009, Bulgaria, p/f/d)
- Fernando del Paso (1935–2018, Mexico, f/nf/p)
- Joaquín Pasos (1914–1947, Nicaragua, p/nf)
- Josefina Passadori (1900–1987, Italy/Argentina, nf/ch)
- Gunter Silva Passuni (born 1977, Peru, f)
- Ámbar Past (born 1949, US/Mexico, p)
- Boris Pasternak (1890–1960, Russia/Soviet Union, f/nf)
- Leon Pasternak (1910–1969, Austria-Hungary/Poland, p/nf)
- Mrs Henry de la Pasture (1866–1945, England, f/d/ch)
- Kenneth Patchen (1911–1972, US, p/f)
- Raj Patel (born 1972, England/US, f/nf)
- Ravji Patel (1939–1968, India, p/f)
- Shailja Patel (living, Kenya, p/d/nf)
- Shenaz Patel (born 1966, Mauritius, f/d)
- Banjo Paterson (1864–1941, Australia, p/f)
- Craig Paterson (born 1959, Scotland, nf)
- Don Paterson (born 1963, Scotland, p/d/nf)
- Katherine Paterson (born 1932, China/US, ch)
- Surender Mohan Pathak (born 1940, India, f)
- Raphael Patkanian (1830–1892, Russian E, p)
- Coventry Patmore (1823–1896, England, p/nf)
- Gladys Lomafu Pato (born 1930, Swaziland, f)
- Alan Paton (1903–1988, S Africa, f/nf)
- Justin Paton (born 1972, N Zealand, nf)
- William Roger Paton (1857–1921, Scotland/Greece, nf)
- Brian Patten (born 1946, England, p)
- James Patterson (born 1947, US, f/nf)
- Eliot Pattison (born 1951, US, f/nf)
- Jenny Pattrick (born 1936, N Zealand, f)
- Evelyn Patuawa-Nathan (1933–2019, N Zealand, f/p)
- Lekhnath Paudyal (1885–1966, Nepal, p)
- Caroline Paul (born 1963, US, f/nf)
- Elliot Paul (1891–1958, US, nf/d)
- Paul I, Prince Esterházy (1635–1713, Hungary, p)
- Jean Paul (1763–1825, Germany, f), pseudonym of Johann Paul Friedrich Richter
- Gary Paulsen (1939–2021, US, ch/d)
- Dora Pavel (born 1946, Romania, f/nf/p)
- Michelle Paver (born 1960, England, f/ch)
- Cesare Pavese (1908–1950, Italy, f/p/nf)
- Milorad Pavić (1929–2009, Yugoslavia/Serbia, f/p/nf)
- Stel Pavlou (born 1970, England, d/f)
- Milivoje Pavlović (born 1947, Yugoslavia/Serbia, nf)
- Milorad Pavić (1929–2009, Yugoslavia/Serbia, f/p/nf)
- Maria Pawlikowska-Jasnorzewska (1891–1945, Poland/England, p/d)
- Stel Pavlou (born 1970, England, d/f)
- Konstantin Pavlov (1933–2008, Bulgaria, d/p)
- Miodrag Pavlović (1928–2014, Yugoslavia/Germany, p/nf/d)
- Slaviša Pavlović (born 1982, Yugoslavia/Serbia, f/p)
- Živojin Pavlović (1933–1998, Yugoslavia/Serbia, f/d)
- Milena Pavlović-Barili (1909–1945, Serbia/US, p)
- Božin Pavlovski (born 1942, Bulgaria/Australia, f/nf)
- Lois Paxton (1916–2002, Scotland/England, f), pseudonym of Lois Dorothea Low
- Rachel Cosgrove Payes (1922–1998, US, f/ch)
- James Payn (1830–1898, England, f)
- David William Paynter (1791–1823, England, f/d/nf)
- Roberto Payró (1867–1928, Argentina, nf/f)
- José María Paz (1791–1854, Argentina, nf)
- Marcela Paz (1902–1985, Chile, ch/f)
- Octavio Paz (1914–1998, Mexico, p/nf)
- Parween Pazhwak (born 1967, Afghanistan, p/f)
- Péter Pázmány (1570–1637, Transylvania/Hungary, nf)

== Pe–Ph ==
- Hla Pe (1913–2007, Burma/Myanmar, nf)
- Ohn Pe (c. 1917–2008, Burma/Myanmar, nf)
- David Peace (born 1967, England, f/nf)
- Thomas Love Peacock (1785–1866, England, f/p)
- Isabel Peacocke (1881–1973, N Zealand, n)
- Mervyn Peake (1911–1968, China/England, f/p/ch)
- A. J. Pearce (born 1964, England, f)
- Joseph Pearce (born 1961, England/US, nf)
- Philippa Pearce (1920–2006, England, f/nf/ch)
- Frances Mary Peard (1835–1923, England, f/ch)
- Patrick Pearse (1879–1916, Ireland, p/nf)
- Bill Pearson (1922–2002, N Zealand, f/nf)
- Diane Pearson (1931–2017, England, f)
- Hesketh Pearson (1887–1964, England, nf)
- James Larkin Pearson (1879–1981, US, p)
- Kit Pearson (born 1947, Canada, f/ch)
- Ridley Pearson (born 1953, US, f/ch)
- T. R. Pearson (born 1956, US, f/nf)
- Allan Pease (born 1952, Australia, nf/f)
- Howard Pease (1894–1974, US, f)
- F. David Peat (1938–2017, England/Italy, nf)
- Vid Pečjak (1929–2016, Yugoslavia/Slovenia, nf/f/ch)
- Dale Peck (born 1967, US, f/nf/ch)
- Robert Newton Peck (1928–2020, US, ch)
- Winifred Peck (1882–1962, England, f/nf)
- Allasani Peddana (fl. 15th – 16th c. CE, Vijayanagara E, p)
- Margaret Pedler (1877–1948, England, f)
- Ethel Pedley (1859–1898, England/Australia, ch/nf)
- Erica Pedretti (1930–2022, Czechoslovakia/Switzerland, nf/f)
- Inês Pedrosa (born 1962, Portugal, f/ch/d)
- Mary Louise Peebles (1833–1915, US, ch), pseudonym Lynde Palmer
- John Peel (born 1954, England, f/d)
- Bill Peet (1915–2002, US, ch)
- Charles Péguy (1873–1914, France, p/nf)
- Annette Pehnt (born 1967, Germany, nf)
- Kira Peikoff (born 1985, US, f)
- Hayford Peirce (1942–2020, US, f)
- Kathleen Peirce (born 1956, US, p)
- Alvarenga Peixoto (1744–1793, Brazil, p)
- José Luís Peixoto (born 1974, Portugal, f/p/ch)
- Borislav Pekić (1930–1992, Yugoslavia, f)
- Vasa Pelagić (1833–1899, Ottoman E/Serbia, nf)
- Elin Pelin (1877–1949, Ottoman E/Bulgaria, fp)
- Judith Pella (living, US, f)
- Charles Pellegrino (born 1953, US, nf/f)
- Nicky Pellegrino (born 1964, N Zealand, f)
- William Dudley Pelley (1890–1965, US, d/f)
- Carlos Pellicer (1897–1977, Mexico, p)
- Rowan Pelling (born 1968, England, nf)
- Ulrich Peltzer (born 1956, Germany, f)
- Luisa Peluffo (born 1941, Argentina, p/f/nf)
- Dave Pelzer (born 1960, US, nf)
- H. Pemberton (fl. 1860s – 1870s, England, f/nf), perhaps Helen Crookshank (1830–1877)
- Horacio Peña (born 1936, Nicaragua, p)
- Martins Pena (1815–1848, Brazil, d)
- Gabino Coria Peñaloza (1881–1975, Argentina, p)
- Nathan Penlington (living, England, p/nf)
- Ian Penman (born 1959, England, nf)
- Jessie Penn-Lewis (1861–1927, Wales/England, nf)
- Daniel Pennac (born 1944, Morocco/France, ch/f)
- Meirion Pennar (1944–2010, Wales, p/f)
- Edmund Penning-Rowsell (1913–2002, England, nf)
- Michael Pennington (1943–2026, England, nf)
- Sarah, Lady Pennington (c. 1720–1783, England, nf)
- Anne Penny (1729–1784, Wales/England, p)
- Nicholas Penny (born 1949, England, nf)
- Ethel Penrose (1857–1938, Ireland, ch)
- John Penry (1563–1593, Wales/England, nf)
- Louise Pentland (born 1985, England, nf)
- Ernst Penzoldt (1892–1955, Germany, f/nf/ch)
- Pepetela (born 1941, Angola, f), pseudonym of Artur Carlos Maurício Pestana dos Santos
- Emily Pepys (1833–1877, England, nf)
- Henry Pepys (1783–1860, England, nf)
- Samuel Pepys (1633–1703, England, nf)
- Anna Percival (1906–1993, England, f), pseudonym of Eleanor Burford Hibbert
- Elizabeth Percy, Duchess of Northumberland (1716–1776, England, nf)
- Walker Percy (1916–1990, US, f/nf)
- Georges Perec (1936–1982, France, f/nf)
- José de Fontes Pereira (1838–1891, Angola, nf)
- Sam Pereira (living, US, p)
- Benjamin Péret (1899–1959, France, p)
- I. L. Peretz (1852–1915, Poland, f/d)
- Galo René Pérez (1923–2008, Ecuador, nf/p)
- Arturo Pérez-Reverte (born 1951, Spain, f/nf)
- Louis Pergaud (1882–1915, France, f/p)
- Cristina Peri Rossi (born 1941, Uruguay/Spain, f/p)
- Bonaventure des Périers (c. 1500–1544, France, nf/p)
- Lucia Perillo (1958–2016, US, p/f)
- Emily Perkins (born 1970, N Zealand, f)
- Lucy Fitch Perkins (1865–1937, US, ch)
- Lynne Rae Perkins (born 1956, US, ch)
- Sarah Maria Clinton Perkins (1824–1905, US, ch)
- William Perkins (1558–1602, England, nf)
- Néstor Osvaldo Perlongher (1949–1992, Argentina, p/nf)
- Lydia Perović (living, Montenegro/Canada, f)
- Perpetua and Felicity (fl. 3rd c., Carthage, nf)
- Charles Perrault (1628–1703, France, ch)
- E. du Perron (1899–1940, Dutch East Indies/Netherlands, p/f)
- Anne Perry (1938–2023, England, f)
- Grace Perry (1927–1987, Australia, p/d)
- Grayson Perry (born 1960, England, nf)
- Sarah Perry (born 1979, England, f)
- Steve Perry (born 1947, US, d/f)
- Lakshmi Persaud (1939–2024, Trinidad/England, f)
- Saint-John Perse (1887–1975, Guadeloupe/France, p)
- Synnøve Persen (born 1950, Norway, p)
- Persius (34–62 CE, Rome, p), full name Aulus Persius Flaccus
- Malte Persson (born 1976, Sweden, f/p)
- Leo Perutz (1882–1957, Austrian E/Austria, f)
- Vesna Pešić (born 1940, Yugoslavia/Serbia, nf)
- Camilo Pessanha (1867–1926, Portugal/Macau, p)
- Fernando Pessoa (1888–1935, Portugal, p/nf)
- Johann Heinrich Pestalozzi (1746–1827, Switzerland, nf)
- Michael Alfred Peszke (1932–2015, Poland/US, nf)
- Basildon Peta (born c. 1972, Zimbabwe/S Africa, nf)
- Alice E. Heckler Peters (1845–1921, US, nf/p)
- Lenrie Peters (1932–2009, Gambia/Senegal, f/p)
- Maureen Peters (1935–2008, Wales/England, f/nf)
- Robert Peters (1924–2014, US, p/nf/d)
- Marie Bjelke Petersen (1874–1969, Denmark/Australia, f)
- Len Peterson (1917–2008, Canada, d/f)
- Pascale Petit (born 1953, France/Wales, p)
- András Petőcz (born 1959, Hungary, p/nf/f)
- Sándor Petőfi (1823–1849, Hungary/Transylvania, p)
- Stephen Petranek (living, US, nf)
- Petrarch (1304–1374, Italy, p/nf), full name Francesco Petrarca
- James Petras (1937–2026, US, nf)
- Camil Petrescu (1894–1957, Romania, d/f/p)
- Cezar Petrescu (1892–1961, Romania, f/ch)
- Julius Richard Petri (1852–1921, Germany, nf)
- György Petri (1943–2000, Hungary, p)
- Nevenka Petrić (1927–2015, Yugoslavia/Serbia, nf/p)
- Ioane Petritsi (fl. 11th–12th cc., Georgia, nf)
- Kata Szidónia Petrőczy (1659–1708, Hungary, nf/p)
- Petronius (c. 27–66 CE, Rome, f), full name Titus Petronius Niger
- Marine Petrossian (born 1960, Armenia, p/nf)
- Valeri Petrov (1920–2014, Bulgaria, p/d), pseudonym of Valeri Nisim Mevorah
- Goran Petrović (born 1961, Yugoslavia/Serbia, f/nf/d)
- Rastko Petrović (1898–1949, Serbia/US, p/f)
- Uroš Petrović (born 1967, Yugoslavia/Serbia, f)
- Veljko Petrović (1884–1967, Austria-Hungary/Yugoslavia, p/f)
- Zoran Petrović (1954–2018, Yugoslavia/Serbia, p/f/ch)
- Mirko Petrović-Njegoš (1820–1867, Montenegro, p)
- Petar II Petrović-Njegoš (1813–1851, Montenegro, p/nf)
- Pande Petrovski (1943–2006, Yugoslavia/N Macedonia, nf)
- Mario Petrucci (born 1958, England, p/nf)
- Mihail Petruševski (1911–1990, Ottoman E/Yugoslavia, nf)
- Per Petterson (born 1952, Norway, f)
- Dianne Ruth Pettis (1955–2008, N Zealand, f/nf)
- Brynjólfur Pétursson (1810–1851, Iceland, nf)
- Hallgrímur Pétursson (1614–1672, Iceland, p/nf)
- Hannes Pétursson (born 1931, Iceland, p/f/nf)
- K. M. Peyton (1929–2023, England, ch)
- Ludwig Pfau (1821–1894, Germany, p)
- Hoa Pham (living, Australia, f/ch/d)
- LeUyen Pham (born 1973, Vietnam/US, ch)
- Anna Augusta Von Helmholtz-Phelan (1890–1964, US, nf/p)
- James Clancy Phelan (born 1979, Australia, f/ch/nf)
- Nancy Phelan (1913–2008, Australia, f/nf)
- Pherecydes of Athens (fl. c. 465 BCE, Greece, nf)
- Nathaniel Philbrick (born 1956, US, nf)
- Rodman Philbrick (born 1951, US, ch/f)
- St John Philby (1885–1960, Ceylon/Lebanon, nf)
- Ambrose Philips (1674–1749, England, p)
- Katherine Philips (1631/1632–1664, England, p/nf), pseudonym The Matchless Orinda
- Tracy Philipps (1888–1959, England, nf)
- Robert Phillimore (1810–1885, England, nf)
- April Phillips (living, England/N Zealand, d)
- Carly Phillips (born 1965, US, f)
- Caryl Phillips (born 1958, Saint Kitts and Nevis/US, f/d/nf)
- David Graham Phillips (1867–1911, US, f/nf)
- Eluned Phillips (1914–2009, Wales, f)
- Susan Elizabeth Phillips (born 1948, US, f)
- Philo (c. 20 BCE – c. 50 CE, Egypt, nf)
- René Philombé (1930–2001, Cameroon, p/f/d), pseudonym of Philippe Louis Ombedé
- Geoffrey Philp (born 1958, Jamaica, f/d)
- Joan Phipson (1912–2003, Australia, ch)
- Desmond Dudwa Phiri (1931–2019, Nyasaland/Malawi, nf/d)
- Savitribai Phule (1831–1897, India, nf/p)

== Pi–Pl ==
- Pi O (born 1951, Greece/Australia, p)
- Pi Rixiu (皮日休, c. 834–883, China, p)
- Hajasoa Vololona Picard (born 1956, Mozambique/Réunion, nf/f/p)
- Menotti Del Picchia (1892–1988, Brazil, p/nf)
- Anita Pichler (1948–1997, Italy, f/nf)
- Karoline Pichler (1769–1843, Austria, f)
- Tom Pickard (born 1946, England, p)
- Jodi Picoult (born 1966, US, f)
- Phyllis Piddington (1910–2001, Australia, f/p)
- Tamora Pierce (born 1954, US, f/ch)
- Clara D. Pierson (1868–1962, US, ch)
- Nicolaas Pierson (1839–1909, Netherlands, nf)
- Cosmo Pieterse (born 1930, SW Africa/Namibia, d/p/nf)
- Arturo Uslar Pietri (1906–2001, Venezuela, f/p/nf)
- Pedro Pietri (1944–2004, Puerto Rico, p/d)
- David Pietrusza (born 1949, US, nf/ch)
- Ricardo Piglia (1941–2017, Argentina, f)
- Felipe Pigna (born 1959, Argentina, nf)
- Leonie Pihama (born 1962, N Zealand, nf)
- Christopher Pike (born 1955, US, ch)
- Phumlani Pikoli (1988–2021, Zimbabwe/S Africa, f/nf)
- Rosamunde Pilcher (1924–2019, England/Scotland, f)
- János Pilinszky (1921–1981, Hungary, p)
- Dav Pilkey (born 1966, US, ch)
- Mary Pilkington (1761–1839, England, f/p/ch)
- Ion Pillat (1891–1945, Romania, p)
- Rodolfo Pérez Pimentel (born 1939, Ecuador, nf)
- Rui de Pina (1440–1522, Portugal, nf)
- João de Pina-Cabral (born 1954, Portugal, nf)
- Sarah Pinborough (born 1972, England, f/ch/d)
- Elizabeth Pinchard (fl. 1791–1820, England, ch)
- Ivy Pinchbeck (1898–1982, England, nf)
- Pindar (c. 518–438 BCE, Greece, p), full name Pindaros
- Gisèle Pineau (born 1956, France/Guadeloupe, f)
- Claudia Piñeiro (born 1960, Argentina, f/d)
- Virgilio Piñera (1912–1979, Cuba, p/nf)
- Miguel Piñero (1946–1988, Puerto Rico, d)
- Daniel H. Pink (born 1964, US, nf)
- Steven Pinker (born 1954, Canada/US, nf)
- Percy Edward Pinkerton (1855–1946, England, p)
- Jerry Pinkney (1939–2021, US, ch/d)
- Daniel Pinkwater (born 1941, US, ch/f/nf)
- Nélida Piñon (1937–2022, Brazil, f)
- Robert Pinsky (born 1940, US, p/nf)
- Harold Pinter (1930–2008, England, d)
- Fernão Mendes Pinto (c. 1509–1583, Portugal, nf)
- Roxana Pinto (living, Costa Rica, p/f/nf)
- Ziraldo Alves Pinto (born 1932, Brazil, f/nf/ch)
- Heinz Piontek (1925–2003, Germany, p/nf)
- H. Beam Piper (1904–1964, US, f)
- Myfanwy Piper (1911–1997, England, p/d/nf)
- Luigi Pirandello (1867–1936, Italy, d/f/p)
- Farhad Pirbal (born 1961, Iraq, f/nf)
- Willibald Pirckheimer (1470–1530, Germany, nf)
- José Cardoso Pires (1925–1998, Portugal, f/d/nf)
- Tomé Pires (c. 1465–1524 or 1540, Portugal, nf)
- Mark Pirie (born 1974, N Zealand, p/nf)
- Saviour Pirotta (born 1958, Malta/England, ch)
- Robert M. Pirsig (1928–2017, US, f/nf)
- Zoya Pirzad (born 1952, Iran, f)
- José Luis Rodríguez Pittí (born 1971, Panama, f/nf)
- Doris Piserchia (1928–2021, US, f)
- Vladimir Pištalo (born 1960, Yugoslavia/US, f/nf)
- Peter Pišťanek (1960–2015, Czechoslovakia/Slovakia, f/nf)
- Annabel Pitcher (born 1982, England, ch)
- Sergio Pitol (1933–2018, Mexico, f/nf)
- Marie Pitt (1869–1948, Australia, p)
- Sarah Pitt (fl. 1881–1900, England, ch)
- Ruth Pitter (1897–1992, England, p)
- José Luis Rodríguez Pittí (born 1971, Panama, f/p/nf)
- Denis Pitts (1930–1994, England, nf/f)
- Hermann Peter Piwitt (1935–2026, Germany, f/nf)
- Christine de Pizan (1364 – c. 1430, Italy/France, f/nf), full name Cristina da Pizzano
- Daniel Samper Pizano (born 1945, Colombia, nf)
- Alejandra Pizarnik (1936–1972, Argentina)
- Yolanda Arroyo Pizarro (born 1970, Puerto Rico, f/nf)
- Marjorie Pizer (1920–2016, Australia, p)
- Mato Pižurica (born 1942, Yugoslavia/Serbia, nf)
- Erin Pizzey (born 1939, England, f/nf)
- Helgi Pjeturss (1872–1949, Iceland, nf)
- Tamri Pkhakadze (born 1957, USSR/Georgia, f/d/ch)
- Josefina Plá (1903–1999, Canary Islands/Paraguay, p/d/nf)
- Sol Plaatje (1876–1932, S Africa, nf)
- Jean Plaidy (1906–1993, England, f), pseudonym of Eleanor Burford Hibbert
- Belva Plain (1915–2010, US, f)
- Nigel Planer (born 1953, England, f/d)
- August von Platen-Hallermünde (1796–1835, Germany/Italy, p/d)
- Sylvia Plath (1932–1963, US/England, p/f)
- Plato (c. 427 – c. 347 BC, Greece, nf)
- Karen Platt (living, England, nf)
- Kin Platt (1911–2003, US, d/ch)
- Agneta Pleijel (born 1940, Sweden, f/p/d)
- Ulrich Plenzdorf (1934–2007, Germany, f/d)
- Andrei Pleșu (born 1948, Romania, nf)
- José Pliva (born 1966, Benin, d)
- Jean Pliya (1931–2015, Benin/Ivory Coast, d/f)
- Luise von Ploennies (1803–1872, Germany, p/d)
- William Plomer (1903–1973, S Africa/England, f/p/nf
- Vivienne Plumb (born 1955, N Zealand, p/d/f)
- Amélie Plume (born 1943, Switzerland, f/nf)
- Edward Plunkett, 18th Baron of Dunsany (1878–1957, England/Ireland, f/d/p)
- Plutarch (46–119 CE, Greece/Roman E, nf)

== Po ==
- Ivy Pochoda (born 1977, US, f)
- Michael Podro (1931–2008, England, nf)
- Jacek Podsiadło (born 1964, Poland, p/nf)
- Tešan Podrugović (1775–1815, Ottoman E/Austrian E, p)
- Edgar Allan Poe (1809–1849, US, f/nf/p)
- Suman Pokhrel (born 1967, Nepal, p/d)
- Frederik Pohl (1919–2013, US, f)
- Peter Pohl (born 1940, Germany/Sweden, f)
- Suman Pokhrel (born 1967, Nepal, p/d)
- Wincenty Pol (1807–1872, Austrian E, p/nf)
- Gillian Polack (born 1961, Australia, f/nf)
- Marcella Polain (born 1958, Singapore/Australia, p/f)
- Thomas Pole (1753–1829, US/England, nf)
- Stephen Poliakoff (born 1952, England, d)
- Daniel Poliquin (born 1953, Canada, f)
- Branko Ve Poljanski (1898–1947, Austria-Hungary/Germany, p)
- Leonora Polkinghorne (1873–1953, Australia, f/p/nf)
- Albert Pollard (1869–1948, England, nf)
- Josephine Pollard (1834–1892, US, p/ch)
- Margaret Steuart Pollard (1904–1996, England, p)
- Velma Pollard (1937–2025, Jamaica, p/f)
- Edward Pollock (1823–1858, US, p)
- Sharon Pollock (1936–2021, Canada, d)
- Elizabeth Polwhele (c. 1651–1691, England, d)
- Richard Polwhele (1760–1838, England, p/nf)
- Rafael Pombo (1833–1912, Colombia, p)
- John Pomfret (1667–1702, England, p)
- Raul Pompeia (1863–1895, Brazil, f/nf)
- Juan García Ponce (1932–2003, Mexico, f/d)
- Francis Ponge (1899–1988, France, nf/p)
- Elena Poniatowska (born 1932, France/Mexico, nf/f)
- Hana Ponická (1922–2007, Czechoslovakia/Slovakia, d/nf)
- Ramesh Ponnuru (born 1974, US, nf)
- Marie Ponsot (1921–2019, US, p/nf)
- Giovanni Pontano (1426–1503, Italy, nf/p)
- George Ayliffe Poole (1809–1883, England, nf)
- Hannah Pool (born 1974, Eritrea/England, nf)
- Thomas Poole (1765–1837, England, nf)
- Clare Pooley (living, England, f/nf)
- Vasko Popa (1922–1991, Yugoslavia/Serbia, p)
- Alexander Pope (1688–1744, England, p)
- Cora Scott Pond Pope (1856 – post-1932, US, f)
- Dudley Pope (1925–1997, England/Saint Martin, f/nf)
- Robert J. Pope (1865–1945, N Zealand, p/nf)
- Dumitru Radu Popescu (1935–2023, Romania, f/d/p)
- Alek Popov (born 1966, Bulgaria, f/nf/d)
- Fani Popova-Mutafova (1902–1977, Bulgaria, f)
- Bogdan Popović (1863–1944, Serbia/Yugoslavia, nf)
- Danko Popović (1928–2009, Yugoslavia/Serbia, f/d)
- Jovan Popović (1905–1952, Austria-Hungary/Yugoslavia, nf)
- Jovan Sterija Popović (1806–1856, Austrian E, d/p)
- Koča Popović (1908–1992, Serbia/Yugoslavia, nf)
- Pavle Popović (1868–1939, Serbia/Yugoslavia, nf)
- Petar Popović (1904–1995, Serbia/Yugoslavia, p)
- Titus Popovici (1930–1994, Romania, d)
- Zoran T. Popovski (born 1962, Yugoslavia/N Macedonia, nf)
- Antonio Porchia (1885–1968, Italy/Argentina, p)
- Judith Pordon (born 1954, US, p/nf)
- Aída Cartagena Portalatín (1918–1994, Dominican Rep., p/f/nf)
- Juan Carlos Portantiero (1934–2007, Argentina, nf)
- Ena Lucía Portela (1972, Cuba, f)
- Anna Maria Porter (1780–1832, England, p/f)
- Delia Lyman Porter (1858–1933, US, ch/f/nf)
- Dorothy Porter (1954–2008, Australia, p/nf/ch)
- Eleanor H. Porter (1868–1920, US, ch/f)
- George Porter (1920–2002, England, nf)
- Hal Porter (1911–1984, Australia, f/d/p)
- Jane Porter (1776–1850, England/Scotland, 1776–1850, f/d)
- Katherine Anne Porter (1890–1980, US, nf/f)
- Marie Porter (born 1939, Australia, nf)
- Peter Porter (1929–2010, Australia/England, p/nf)
- Sheena Porter (born 1935, England, ch)
- Tracey Porter (living, US, ch)
- Charles Portis (1933–2020, US, f/nf)
- Manuel de Araújo Porto-Alegre, Baron of Santo Ângelo (1906–1979, Brazil, p/d/f)
- Posidippus (316 – c. 250 CE, Greece, p)
- Abel Posse (1934–2023, Argentina, f/nf/p)
- Laurens van der Post (1906–1996, Orange Free State/England, f/nf)
- Jacob Post (1774–1855, England, nf)
- Sue-Ann Post (born 1964, Australia, nf)
- John Postgate (1820–1821, England, nf)
- John Postgate (1922–2014, England, nf)
- John Percival Postgate (1853–1926, England, nf)
- Oliver Postgate (1925–2008, England, d/ch)
- Raymond Postgate (1896–1971, England, nf/f)
- Halina Poświatowska (1935–1967, Poland, p/nf)
- Roma Potiki (born 1958, N Zealand, p/d)
- Jan Potocki (1761–1815, Polish-Lithuanian C/Russian E, nf/f)
- Wacław Potocki (1621–1696, Poland, p/nf)
- Beatrix Potter (1866–1943, England, ch)
- Dennis Potter (1935–1994, England, d)
- Ellen Potter (born 1960s, US, ch/f)
- Robert Potter (1721–1804, England, nf)
- Anna M. Longshore Potts (1829–1912, US, nf)
- Mahananda Poudyal (1931 – post-1988, Nepal, f/p)
- Louis-Marie Pouka (fl. mid-20th c., Cameroon, p)
- Jacques Poulin (1937–2025, Canada, f)
- Ezra Pound (1885–1972, US/Italy, p/nf)
- Jerry Pournelle (1933–2017, US, nf/f)
- Anthony Powell (1905–2000, England, f)
- Craig Powell (born 1940, Australia, p)
- Patricia Powell (born 1966, Jamaica, f)
- Violet Powell (1912–2002, England, nf)
- Eileen Power (1889–1940, England, nf)
- Rhoda Power (1890–1957, England, ch)
- J. F. Powers (1917–1999, US, f)
- Tim Powers (born 1952, US, f)
- Eve Pownall (1901–1982, Australia, ch/nf)
- John Cowper Powys (1872–1963, England/Wales, p/f/nf)
- T. F. Powys (1875–1953, England, f/nf)
- Heather Graham Pozzessere (born 1953, US, f), pseudonym Shannon Drake

== Pr–Py ==
- James Van Praagh (born 1958, US, nf)
- Alishetty Prabhakar (1954–1993, India, p)
- Manuel González Prada (1844–1918, Peru, nf)
- Tapan Kumar Pradhan (born 1972, India, p)
- Adélia Prado (born 1935, Brazil, p/nf)
- Rosa Campbell Praed (1851–1935, Australia, f/p/ch)
- Winthrop Mackworth Praed (1802–1839, England, p/nf)
- Johannes Praetorius, pseudonym of Hans Schultze (1630–1680, Germany, nf)
- Jaishankar Prasad (1889–1937, India, f/d/p)
- Terry Pratchett (1948–2015, England, f)
- Vasco Pratolini (1913–1991, Italy, d/f)
- E. J. Pratt (1883–1964, Newfoundland/Canada, p)
- Marin Preda (1922–1980, Romania, f)
- Dušan Prelević (1948–2007, Yugoslavia/Serbia, f/nf)
- Premchand (1880–1936, India, f/nf), pseudonym of Dhanpat Rai Srivastava
- Paula von Preradović (1887–1951, Austria/Yugoslavia, p/f)
- H. F. M. Prescott (1896–1972, England, f/nf)
- France Prešeren (1800–1849, Austrian E, p)
- ArLynn Leiber Presser (born 1960, US, f)
- Steven Pressfield (born 1943, US, f/nf/d)
- Thomas Peckett Prest (c. 1810 – c. 1869, England, f)
- Richard Preston (born 1954, US, nf/f)
- Thomas Preston (1537–1598, England, d/p)
- Ron Pretty (1940–2023, Australia, p/nf)
- Paul Preuss (born 1942, US, f/nf)
- Otfried Preußler (1923–2013, Czechoslovakia/Germany, ch)
- Jacques Prévert (1900–1977, France, p/d)
- Abbé Prévost (1697–1763, France, f/nf)
- Angharad Price (born 1972, Wales, nf/f)
- Evadne Price (1888–1985, Australia, f/ch/nf)
- Nicholas A. Price (born 1962, US)
- Richard Price (1723–1791, Wales, England, nf)
- Richard Price (born 1966, Scotland/England, p/f)
- Thomas Price (Carnhuanawc) (1787–1848, Wales, nf)
- Willard Price (1887–1983, Canada/US, nf/f)
- Caradog Prichard (1904–1980, Wales/England, p/f)
- James Cowles Prichard (1886–1948, England, nf)
- Katharine Susannah Prichard (1883–1969, Fiji/Australia, f/d/p)
- Rhys Prichard (1579–1644, Wales, p)
- Christopher Priest (1943–2024, England, f)
- Robert Priest (born 1951, England/Canada, p/ch)
- J. B. Priestley (1894–1984, England, f/d/nf)
- Joseph Priestley (1733–1804, England/US, nf)
- Rebecca Priestley (living, N Zealand, nf)
- Diane di Prima (1934–2020, US, p/nf)
- Elise Primavera (born 1955, US, ch)
- Paskoje Primojević (fl. 1482–1527, Ragusa, p)
- Alison Prince (1931–2019, England/Scotland, ch/d)
- F. T. Prince (1912–2003, S Africa/England, p/nf)
- John Critchley Prince (1808–1866, England, p)
- Eric Pringle (1935–2017, England, d/ch)
- Matthew Prior (1664–1721, England, p)
- John Prise (1501 or 1502–1555, Wales, nf)
- Harri Pritchard-Jones (1933–2015, England/Wales, p/nf/f)
- V. S. Pritchett (1900–1997, England, f/nf)
- Bryan Procter (1787–1874, England, p)
- Jaša Prodanović (1867–1948, Serbia/Yugoslavia, nf)
- Raul Proença (1884–1941, Portugal, nf)
- Lilli Promet (1922–2007, Estonia, f/nf)
- Propertius (c. 50–56 – post-15 BCE, Rome, p), full name Sextus Propertius
- Perch Proshian (1837–1907, Russian E, nf)
- Protagoras (c. 490 – c. 420 BCE, Greece, nf)
- E. Annie Proulx (born 1935, US, f/nf)
- Marcel Proust (1871–1922, France, f)
- Guiot de Provins (died post-1208, France, p)
- Anne Provoost (born 1964, Belgium, f/nf)
- Alf Prøysen (1914–1970, Norway, ch/p/d)
- Sully Prudhomme (1839–1907, France, nf/p)
- Kevin Prufer (born 1969, US, p/nf)
- Janko Prunk (born 1942, Yugoslavia/Slovenia, nf)
- Bolesław Prus (1847–1912, Poland, f/nf)
- Hans Prutz (1843–1929, Germany, nf)
- Robert Prutz (1816–1872, Germany, p/f/nf)
- Myfanwy Pryce (1890–1976, Wales, f)
- J. H. Prynne (1936–2026, England, p)
- William Prynne (1600–1669, England, nf)
- Edmund Prys (1542 or 1543–1623, Wales, p)
- Kazimierz Przerwa-Tetmajer (1865–1940, Austria-Hungary/Poland, p/f/d)
- Zenon Przesmycki (1861–1944, Russian E/Poland, p/nf)
- Jeremi Przybora (1915–2004, Poland, p)
- Stanisław Przybyszewski (1868–1927, Germany/Poland, f/d/p)
- Kathryn Ptacek (born 1952, US, f)
- Ptolemy ( c. 100 – c. 170 CE, Egypt, nf)
- Pu Songling (皮日休, 1640–1715, China, f)
- Medo Pucić (1821–1882, Austrian E, p)
- Niko Pucić (1820–1883, Austrian E, nf)
- Hermann, Fürst von Pückler-Muskau (1785–1871, Germany, nf), pseudonym Semilasso
- John Pudney (1909–1977, England, p/nf/ch)
- William Owen Pughe (1759–1835, Wales, nf)
- Manuel Puig (1932–1990, Argentina, f/d)
- Adriana Puiggrós (born 1941, Argentina, nf)
- Erenora Puketapu-Hetet (1941–2006, N Zealand, nf)
- Luigi Pulci (1432–1484, Italy, p)
- Georgi Pulevski (1817–1895, Ottoman E/Bulgaria, nf)
- Christine Pullein-Thompson (1925–2005, England, ch)
- Diana Pullein-Thompson (1925–2015, England, ch)
- Josephine Pullein-Thompson (1924–2014, England, ch)
- Philip Pullman (born 1946, England, ch)
- Alice Pung (born 1981, Australia, f/ch/nf)
- John Purchas (1823–1872, England, nf/d/p)
- Al Purdy (1918–2000, Canada, p/nf/f)
- James Purdy (1914–2009, US, f/d/p)
- Alexander Pushkin (1799–1837, Russia, p/d)
- Bosiljka Pušić (born 1936, Yugoslavia, ch/p/f)
- Mary Jo Putney (living, US, f)
- Gwilym Puw (c. 1618 – c. 1689, Wales, p)
- Mario Puzo (1920–1999, US, f/d/nf)
- John Pye-Smith (1774–1851, England, nf)
- Howard Pyle (1853–1911, US, ch)
- Barbara Pym (1913–1980, England, f)
- Hugh Pym (born 1959, England, nf)
- Thomas Pynchon (born 1937, US, f/nf)
- Pythagoras (c. 570 – c. 495, Greece, nf)
