= Primojević =

Primojević is a surname. Notable people with the surname include:

- Luka Primojević, Ragusan nobleman and chancellor
- Paskoje Primojević, Serbian writer
