= AMIRCI =

Australian organization

The Australian Motherhood Initiative for Research and Community Involvement (AMIRCI) is a national not-for-profit advocacy and research group (registered in the state of Queensland) and consists of a network of scholars, writers, activists, policy makers, educators, artists and practitioners whose work explores the experience of women as mothers, mothering and motherhood.

The organisation was founded in 2005 as the Association for Research on Mothering — Australia (ARM–A) by academic, Marie Porter. It was established as a sister organisation to the Canadian Association for Research on Mothering (ARM) which was founded by Professor Andrea O'Reilly at York University. In 2010 the name was changed to AMIRCI to match the Canadian organisation's name change to MIRCI. In Canada, MIRCI partnered with Demeter Press to produce a journal and books on motherhood. MIRCI has since changed its name again to IAMAS — International Association of Maternal Action and Scholarship. Like its Canadian counterpart, AMIRCI is focused on developing a matricentric feminist movement through furthering research into motherhood and advocacy for mothers through connection, collaboration and conversation with mothers and feminist professionals.

Following the success of a first conference in 2001, the organisation was formed and since 2005 has hosted bi-annual motherhood conferences chaired by a variety of female experts in their field and covering topics such as, “Motherhood in an Age of Neoliberalism and Individualisation”, “Feminism for Mothers”, and, “Negotiating Competing Demands: 21st Century Motherhood”. Recent keynote speakers have included Professor Andrea O'Reilly on regretful motherhood, Petra Bueskens on the failure of the welfare system to support single mothers, Renate Klein on the misogyny of surrogacy, and Professor Eva Cox on the need for a Universal Basic Income. In earlier years notable speakers have included Jackie Huggins, Maurillia Meehan and Gracelyn Smallwood. In 2018, AMIRCI founder Marie Porter was appointed a Member of the Order of Australia for her work as, "a researcher and advocate for the welfare of women and children".

Conferences showcase cross-disciplinary work with topics spanning pregnancy and childbirth, human rights violations through child removal, lactation, mothering disabled children, the failures of family law and the welfare system, the impact of mothering on women's creative expression, representations of motherhood in literature and film and also feature performances and display of artwork such as a giant knitted placenta. Leading Australian universities have hosted AMIRCI's conferences, including the University of Sydney, RMIT, University of Melbourne, University of Queensland, and La Trobe University in Melbourne.

== List of Conferences ==
2019 Beyond Mothering Myths:Motherhood in an Age of Neoliberalism and Individualisation, University of Sydney.

2017 A Feminism for Mothers [Symposium], Australian Catholic University, Fitzroy, Melbourne.

2016 Negotiating Competing Demands: 21st Century Motherhood, 8th Australian International Conference, RMIT University, Melbourne.

2014 Motherhood, Feminisms and the Future 7th Australian International Conference.RMIT University, Melbourne.

2011 Mothers at the Margins 6th biennial Australian International Conference.The University of Queensland, Brisbane.

2009 The Mother and History: Past and Present 5th biennial Australian International conference. The University of Queensland, Brisbane.

2007 The Mother: Images, Issues and Practices 4th biennial Australian International Conference. The University of Queensland, Brisbane.

2005 Representing and Theorising Maternal Subjectivities 3rdAustralian International Conference. The University of Queensland, Brisbane.

2002 Performing Motherhood: Ideology, Agency and Experience 2nd Australian International Conference. La Trobe University, Melbourne.

2001 Mothering:Power/ Oppression Inaugural biennial Australian International Conference.The University of Queensland, Brisbane.

== Publications ==
- O'Reilly, A. (2016) Matricentric feminism: Theory, activism, and practice. Demeter Press.
- Rogers, Megan (2 September 2015). "Motherhood, feminisms and the future". Journal of Family Studies. 21 (3): 195. doi:10.1080/13229400.2015.1120979. S2CID 146416712. ProQuest 1756184400.
- Jones, Jenny; Raith, Lisa; Porter, Marie (1 March 2015). Mothers at the Margins: Stories of Challenge, Resistance and Love. Cambridge Scholars Publishing. ISBN 9781443879163.
- Brock, Sophia Ashleigh Manuel (2 September 2015). "The individualization thesis and mothering children with disabilities". Journal of Family Studies. 21 (3): 261–281. doi:10.1080/13229400.2015.1086404. S2CID 146678824.
- Porter, Marie. "Focus on mothering: introduction [Paper in: Focus on Mothering.]". Hecate. 36 (1/2): 5–16.
