= Valtazar Bogišić =

Serbian jurist and sociologist (1834–1908)

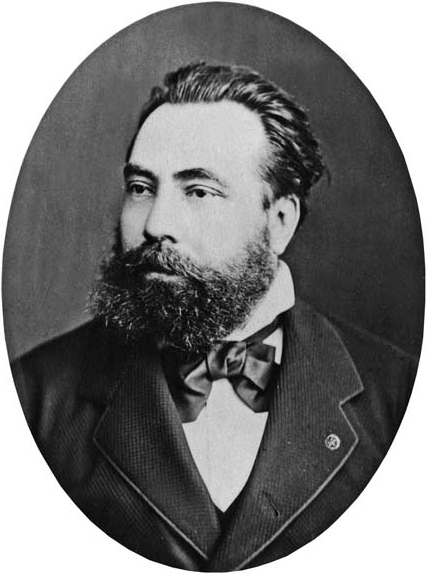

2nd Minister of Justice of Principality of Montenegro
- In office 1893 – 25 November 1899
- Monarch: Nicholas I
- President of the State Council: Božo Petrović-Njegoš
- Preceded by: Božo Petrović-Njegoš
- Succeeded by: Lujo Vojinović

Personal details
- Born: 20 December 1834 Cavtat, Kingdom of Dalmatia, Austrian Empire
- Died: 24 April 1908 (aged 73) Fiume, Austria-Hungary
- Occupation: jurist, sociologist

Valtazar Bogišić (Serbian Cyrillic: Валтазар Богишић; 20 December 1834 – 24 April 1908), also known as Baltazar and Baldo Bogišić, was a Serb jurist from Dubrovnik and a pioneer in sociology.

In the domain of private law his most notable research was on family structure and the unique Montenegrin civil code of 1888. He is considered to be a pioneer in the sociology of law and sociological jurisprudence. He was also a follower of the German Historical School of law, and may be considered a transitional figure between the Historical School and sociological approaches to law. In 1902 Bogišić was elected president of the International Institute of Sociology in Paris.

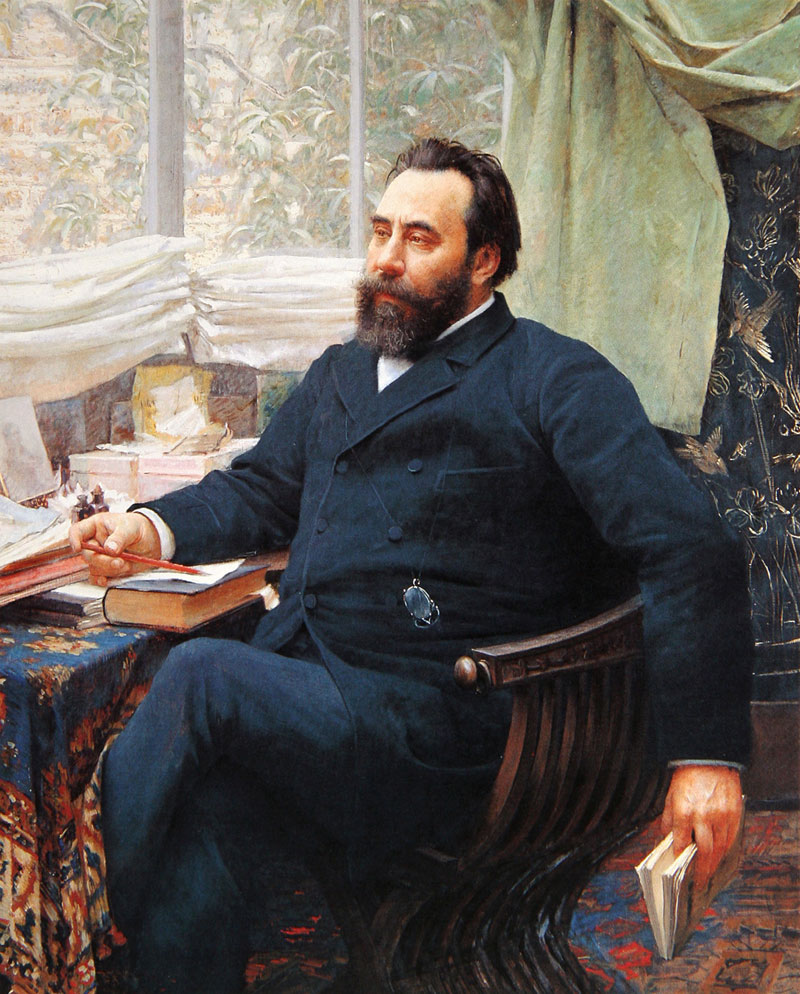
Valtazar Bogišić by Vlaho Bukovac, 1892

== Early life ==
Bogišić's family were prominent merchants in Cavtat, a small coastal town near Dubrovnik. His grandfather moved to Cavtat from nearby inland, from a village called Mrcine in Konavle where the Bogišić clan had lived for centuries after converting from Eastern Orthodoxy to Roman Catholicism in the 15th century.

Bogišić was born in Cavtat on 20 December 1834. His mother died giving birth to his sister Marija, his only sibling, two years later. His father wanted him to continue his family business and thought that prolonged schooling would interfere with that.

When he was four years old he was sent to a private girls' school, the only private school in town, because only six-year-olds could enter a public school. He later entered state accredited school which he left before graduating. Subsequently, when he was 11 he finished a two-year nautical school. He was four to five years younger than all other graduates.

The most significant person in his childhood was his grandfather Valtazar Bogišić Senior. At the time he was already blind and told him a lot of folk stories as well as about his adventures on the sea, traveling, meeting important people like Miloš Obrenović, and authorized his grandson to run his errands and even simple court cases. In his last will his grandfather left Bogišić half of his estate. With no proper formal education, Bogišić was buying a lot of books. When his father didn't give him money he would get it from his grandfather. Among his favorites were the ones by Serbian reformer Vuk Stefanović Karadžić. Inspired by Vuk, his lifelong model, he started searching for and writing down Serbian folk poems.

After a lot of persuasion and a sea accident, his father allowed him to enter 4-year grammar school (Progymnasium) on condition that he not take his final exams as a guarantee that he wouldn't obtain the necessary documents for further schooling. At that time, Bogišić started learning German on his own. He already spoke Italian as it was, lingua franca of the region, at the time.

In that time Bogišić was acquainted with Dubrovnik's count Niko Pucić (Pozza) the Great. This lifelong friend convinced him to take final exams despite his father's will and helped him prepare for them. Count Niko Pucić and his brother Medo Pucić (Orsato) were the most prominent people in Dubrovnik at the time. They gathered the intellectual elite which formed a Serb Catholic movement in Dubrovnik that would disappear in the beginning of the 20th century.

A turning point in Bogišić's life was the death of his father, in 1856. Intrigues about the inheritance and family business followed but after two years Bogišić managed to get the papers in order and recuperate what the cousins had taken. In 1858 he entered the Ginnasio Liceale di S.Caterina di Padua and later entered the prestigious Liceo Foscarini, the oldest highschool in Venice, where he majored in Italian language and literature and got closer to the spirit of Italian national movement.

== Academic education ==
After graduating in Venice, thanks to friends, Bogišić got an Austrian scholarship which he refused because it had a condition that he could only study at Austrian universities. During his studies he was involved with romantic nationalist and pan-Slavic circles. He studied philology, philosophy (including history) and law, and the studies also included some modern courses such as political economy. He was reading in Vienna, Berlin, Munich and Paris with many notable professors like Franz Bopp, the founder of comparative linguistics, Prussian historian Johann Gustav Droysen, Franz Miklosich, one of the most famous Slavic philologists, the founder of sociology Lorenz von Stein and many famous lawyers such as Theodor Mommsen, Rudolf von Jhering and few notable members of German Historical School of Law.

He obtained a Phd in Philosophy in Giessen in 1862, defending the thesis entitled "On Causes of Defeat of the Prussian Army in Hussite War". There he strongly referred to the research of historian František Palacký. He obtained a law degree Rigorosum, the oral part of the doctoral examination in 1865, in Vienna, since at the time he was already employed and had been practicing. When he was appointed professor in Odessa he was also awarded the Juris Doctor Honoris Causa.

== Professional life and public activities ==
=== Vienna ===
Thanks to the certificate issued by Miklosich stating that "besides being a native speaker of Serbian and Italian (Bogišić) speaks all other Slavic languages", after obtaining a PhD in Giessen, in 1862/63 Bogišić was hired as an administrator of the Slavia Department at the Viennese court library. There however he also administered the legal department as well as publications from the French Revolution. As an administrator of the Slavia Department, he had the opportunity not only to read important books by Slavic writers but also to meet many of their authors.

In Vienna of the day different organizations were founded gathering members of different peoples from the Empire. Bogišić participated in the foundation of the club named Slovanska beseda which was, at first, a gathering all Slavs from around the Empire and was later reorganized into a Czech-club. Upon Bogišić's initiative, a special Slavic library was formed in the club (Slovanska biblioteka) and Bogišić was its first president. At this time, Bogišić supported United Serbian Youth (Ujedinjena omladina srpska), and remained their supporter for the rest of his life. The organization pleaded for the real unification of Serbs and Croats into a single Yugoslav nation and not only their formal common political actions, which was the idea of Yugoslavia for many Croatian intellectuals. After the founding of the Yugoslav Academy of Sciences and Arts, Bogišić was one of its most significant writers. The academy was established in Zagreb as a common scientific institution of south Slavic peoples. The first president was a Croat Franjo Rački, and the first secretary a Serb Đuro Daničić.

During his stay in Vienna, he was collecting documents about Dubrovnik's 17th-century diplomat Stjepan Gradić. He continued collecting Serbian epic poetry, which he had started in his youth, and in 1863 he spent the holidays in Mostar, listening to the epic poets gathered around the newly built orthodox church. As early as 1866, he conducted in all the regions of the Balkans a sociological inquiry with many questions concerning the forms of landed property in the country, the social structure of the village, customs, institutions and family community, etc. Using this data, he particularly worked out in detail the problem of direct observation, the comparative methods, the volume of use of statistics and the analysis of documents. In 1867 he issued a book "Pravni običaji kod Slovena" (Legal customs of the Slavs). He mainly based his work on written sources, but he already started questioning his friends about the legal reasoning of the people in their regions. In 1872 he published a book "Pisani zakoni na Slovenskom Jugu" (Legal Status in the Slavic South). The idea was for this book to be an introduction to the serial, which was supposed to grasp written antique legal sources from the Slavic South.

Since his youth, Bogišić was very fond of museums. He believed that establishing a Slavic museum (Slovenski Muzeum) would contribute to the presentation of Slavic heritage, and rising consciousness about it, among the Slavs and others. In his publication "Slovenski Muzeum", he responded to the "Slavofobs" of the day, who argued that Slavic peoples had to develop on their own, like the Germanic or Romanic nations had previously. Here he showed himself to be a panslavist. This, among all Slavs, was a very popular 19th-century movement, originating from Poland and Bohemia, and is today a surpassed form of a collective idealization and identification.

In 1867/68, after the years spent at the Court Library, Bogišić entered the Austro-Hungarian Ministry of Defence, and was named Councilor for Education in the Austrian Military Frontier based in Temesvar in the Banat. The population there was already used to a high degree of self-governance which is why several attempts to improve the school system failed. Regardless, Austria intended to introduce a stronger school system.

=== Odessa ===
After refusing offers from the Universities in Kiev and Warsaw, he accepted a professorship at the newly established Russian University in Odessa. After becoming a Russian citizen and a public servant in 1869, he gave his introductory lecture in Odessa in 1870. His most notable success in Odessa was the foundation of the Slavic Library, while as a professor, he didn't have much success because already in 1871 he caused (as it later turned out – orchestrated) mass student protests. The Austrian press wrote that Bogišić "being a Serb was called to Odessa only due to panslavic respect" and in reality he was not welcomed in Russia. He continued teaching but without the previous enthusiasm. When his request for early retirement was denied, he tried to spend as much time on study trips so he even studied, on sight, legal customs at the Caucasus. He officially remained a professor of the Odessa University but already in 1873, following the orders of the czar, as a Russian subject, he left for Montenegro with a task to codify private law.

=== Montenegro and France ===
In Montenegro, the newspapers wrote that the new Civil Code had already been written before Bogišić even got there. Bogišić, however, persuaded Montenegro's sovereign Nicholas I to wait and explained that work on the code would take years. Earlier, Bogišić had prepared and published questionnaires for collecting legal customs. These were translated into several languages and established Bogišić as a pioneer of ethnological and sociological legal research. Based on the questionnaires, he published a Collection of legal customs of the south Slavs ("Zbornik sadašnjih pravnih običaja u južnih Slovena I, Građa u odgovorima iz različnih krajeva slovneskoga juga") in 1874. Bogišić was not satisfied with the questionnaires because they only had around 300 questions about public and private law including matters of international public law. For the purpose of writing a civil code, he prepared a new questionnaire, which had 2000 questions, all of which were from the domain of private law. He was assisted by Gavro Vuković, one of the few trained jurists in Montenegro at the time.

Bogišić's civil code for Montenegro, The General Property Code (better known in Serbian as Opšti imovinski zakonik), was not proclaimed until 1888. During that time, Bogišić, who was still a Russian professor, established his residence in Paris and engaged in other assignments such as writing a constitution for the Serbian revolutionaries in Herzegovina and establishing state and legal order in Bulgaria which had just gained independence from the Ottoman Empire. In 1878 he published his famous collection of folk poems ("Narodne pjesme iz starijih, najčešće primorskih zapisa I"). He also continued his research on sociological and historical aspects of the family. In legal matters he insisted on the separate codification of family and inheritance law, arguing that family law is not civil law stricto sensu and that inheritance is a family law institution. That is why he refused to incorporate family and inheritance law into the Montenegrin civil code that he wrote, consequently naming it "The General Property Code".

His draft constitution for Herzegovina from 1875, favors basic rights especially the ones pertaining to equality, and is written in the best Republican and liberal tradition thus reflecting the spirit of the local people as well as Bogišić's convictions from his youth. The Constitution is paradigmatic for Bogišić's nomotechnics. With a good eye for the social condition and needs, he managed to transform political ideals into a legal text acceptable for a common man. Such a method would mark The General Property Code for the Principality of Montenegro which contains a strong idealization of people's legal reasoning. During his work on the General Property Code, besides legal customs Bogišić considered well-established institutions of Roman Law. That is how Bogišić's Property Code is, at the same time, based on the notion of just, reception of Roman law and people's mind. Bogišić was especially thoughtful about the language of the code, so the actual code is written in a more polished manner than his other works. Such legal style served as an example for the 19th-century legislation in the Kingdom of Serbia. Even in the second half of the 20th century, the Belgrade legal school referred to Bogišić's code as its role-model and starting point. In that context, Bogišić's code was written at just the right time, when laws in the kingdom of Serbia were written in pure vernacular as was the case with Bogišić's Code. Most Yugoslav laws, given that they were written in Belgrade in the institutional frameworks previously established in the Kingdom of Serbia, belong to this legal-language tradition.

=== Paris and final years ===
After finalizing his work on the Code, Bogišić was for some time the Minister of Justice in the Principality of Montenegro. Afterward, in 1899, the second and last improved version of the General Property Code was published. He then continued to live in Paris as a retired Russian professor. He was active in many Parisian scientific societies. In 1902 he was elected President of International Institute of Sociology.

He lived as prominent citizen in Paris and was often visited by law students from different countries. Especially in those years he often came back to ideas of the United Serbian Youth and prepared a study on Serbo-Croatian controversy. When he left his hometown and Dubrovnik, as a young man, the cultural elite there saw the Dubrovnik heritage as a part of a rising modern Serbian culture. However, at turn of the century, there was great conflict between Serbs and Croats about Dubrovnik's legacy. Considering himself a Serb, Bogišić in those days published his autobiography in the Serbian Annual "Dubrovnik" as well as several articles in the Serbian patriotic paper from Dubrovnik – "Srđ".

Bogišić died in Fiume (Rijeka), on the way to his hometown Cavtat in 1908.

== Legacy and name controversy ==
According to the testimonies of Bogišić's Parisian friends, Bogišić seriously considered establishing a foundation in Belgrade which would, after his death, take care of his legacy especially the scientific library and archive, and give scholarships to prosperous young lawyers for studying abroad. Bogišić chose the Serbian capital Belgrade, fearing that his rich scientific collection might otherwise end up in Austrian hands, who had a hostile attitude toward Slavic culture back in the days before the First World War. At that time, his hometown Cavtat was a part of Austro-Hungary. Since he eventually died with no last will, his sister Marija, who lived in Cavtat, inherited the whole estate including his scientific library and archive. 18,000 books including many rare antiques; 10,000 letters; various notes; ethnological and numismatic collections were kept in Cavtat in inadequate conditions for years. After World War II, the scientific library and archive was incorporated into the Yugoslav Academy of Sciences and Arts. It was then officially named the Baltazar Bogišić Collection (Zbirka Baltazara Bogišića).

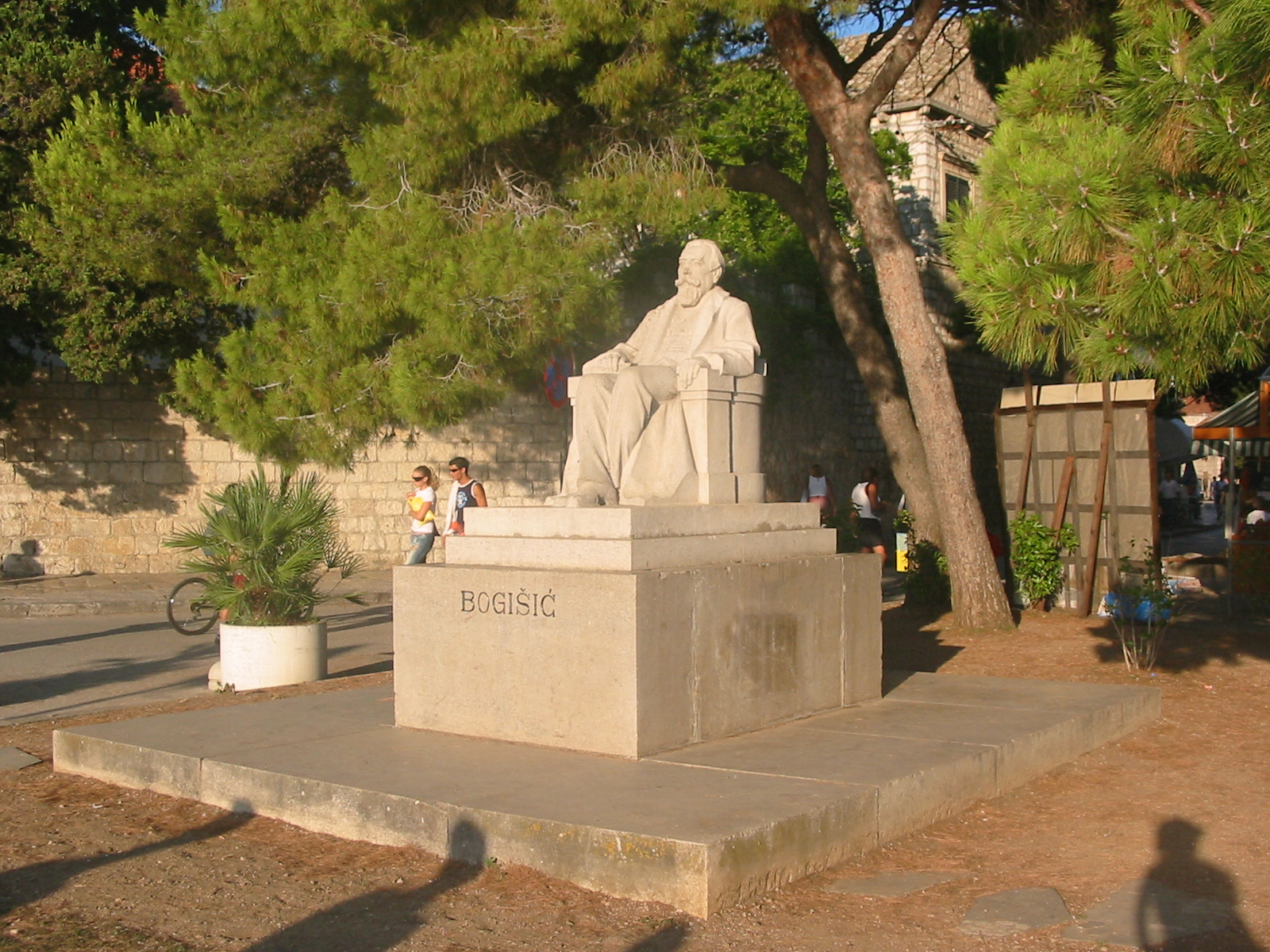
Bogišić Monument at his birthplace Cavtat

Since Italian was an official language in the area of his birth, Bogišić's birth certificate is written in Italian and the Latin language. Bearing his grandfather's name, Bogišić signed all of his works, in all languages, as Valtazar Bogišić and it was the name by which he was recognized by his contemporaries. Since his autobiography was first published in the local paper called "Dubrovnik", the editor noted that the usual nickname for Baldassaro (Italian for Valtazar) in Dubrovnik is Baldo, and consequently referred to him as such with affection. After his death Croatian authors started occasionally calling him Baltazar Bogišić, taking it for the Croatian version of his name. That is why his archive-memorial in his birthplace Cavtat, in today's Croatia, has Baltazar in its name, although that is not how he ever referred to himself.

He is included in The 100 most prominent Serbs.

== Works ==
=== Selected books and other separate publications ===
- Über die Ursachen der Niederlage des deutschen Heeres im Hussitischen Kriege, Gießen 1862.
- Slovenski muzeum, Novi Sad 1867.
- Pravni običaji u Slovena, Zagreb: Jugoslavenska akademija znanosti i umjetnosti, 1867. online
- Oб научной разработке Исторiи Славянского права, St. Peterburg 1870.
- Pisani zakoni na slovenskom jugu, Zagreb: Jugoslavenska akademija znanosti i umjetnosti, 1872. online
- Разборъ сочинения К.А. Попова "Россия и Сербия", St. Petersburg 1872.
- Zbornik sadašnjih pravnih običaja u južnih Slovena I, Građa u odgovorima iz različnih krajeva slovneskoga juga, Zagreb: Jugoslavenska akademija znanosti i umjetnosti, 1874.
- Narodne pjesme iz starijih, najčešće primorskih zapisa I, Beograd: Srpsko učeno društvo, 1878. online
- Aperçu des travaux sur le droit coutumier en Russie, Paris 1879 (Nouvelle Revue historique de Droit français et étranger) = Osvrt na radnje o običajnom pravu u Rusiji, Beograd 1879.
- De la forme de inokostina de la familie rurale chez les Serbes et les Croates, 1184 (Revue de droit international et de législation comparée) O obliku zvanom inokoština u seoskoj porodici Srba i Hrvata, Beograd 1884.
- Apropos du Code civil du Monténégro. Quelques mots sur les principes et la méthode adoptés por sa cofection, Paris 1886 = Povodom crnogorskog građanskog zakonika, Beograd 1888.
- Acta coniurationem Petri a Zrinio et Francisci de Frankopan nec non-Francisci Nadasdy illustrantia, 1663–1671, Zagreb 1888.
- Tehnički termini u zakonodavstvu, Beograd 1887.
- O porodici i nasljedstvu u pravnoj sistemi, Beograd 1893.
- Le statut de Raguse, Paris 1894 (Nouvelle revue historique de droit français et étranger).
- Zbirka slovenskih inkunabula, Dubrovnik 1898.
- Uputstva za sabiranje pravnih običaja srpskog naroda, Beograd 1900.
- Bogišić, Valtazar; Jireček, Constantine (1904). Liber statorum civitatis Ragusii compositus anno 1272. Zagreb – via Internet Archive.
- Pravni običaji u Hercegovini, Crnoj Gori i Albaniji, Titograd: Crnogorska akademija nauka i umjetnosti 1984.

=== Correspondence ===
- Valtazar Bogišić i Franjo Rački – Prepiska, Zbornik za istoriju, jezik i književnost srpskog naroda XXV, 1960.
- Prepiska Stojana Novakovića i Valtazara Bogišića 1842–1915, Zbornik za istoriju, jezik i književnost srpskog naroda XXVIII, 1968.

=== Editions of General Property Code for Montenegro ===
- Opšti imovniski zakonik za knjaževinu Crnu Goru, 1st official ed. 1888, 2nd official ed. 1898, 3rd official ed. 1913.
- Translations:
  - Codigo general de los bienes de Montenegro, Madrid 1891.
  - Code général des biens pour la Principauté de Monténégro de 1888, Paris 1898.
  - Allgemeines Gesetzbuch über das Vermögen für das Fürstentum Montenegro, Berlin 1893.
  - Codice civile generale pel Principato del Montenegro, Spalato 1900.
  - Общий имущественный Законникъ для Княжество черногорского, St, Petersburg 1901.
  - General Property Code for the Principalities of Montenegro, Podgorica 2006.

=== Collected publications ===
- Valtazar Bogišić, Pravne rasprave i članci I, Beograd 1927.
- Valtazar Bogišić, Izabrana dela i opšti imovinski zakonik, Beograd 1986.
- Valtazar Bogišić, Izabrana djela I-VIII, Beograd/Podgorica 1999.
- Valtazar Bogišić, Izabrana djela I-IV, Beograd/Podgorica 2004.

== Sources ==
- Valtazar Bogišić (autobiography) (1938–1940) [1900]. Spomenica Valtazara Bogišića. Dubrovnik: Kalendar Dubrovnik, Dubrovnik; Srpska Dubrovačka Štamparija A. Pasarića.
- Werner Zimmermann (1962). Valtazar Bogišić 1834–1908 – Ein Beitrag zur südslavischen Geistes- und Rechtsgeschichte im 19. Jahrhundert. Wiesbaden.
- Surja Pupovci, Valtazar Bogišić u svetlu dokumenata iz ruskih arhiva, 1996
- Surja Pupovci, Valtazar Bogišić, Podgorica 2004.
- Feodor Demelić, Le Droit contumier des Slaves méridionaux – d'après les recherches de M.V. Bogišić, Paris 1876.
- R. Dareste, Le nouveau Code Civil du Montenegro, 1888.
- Karl Dickel, Über das neue bürgerliche Gesetzbuch für Montenegro und die Bedeutung seiner Grundsätze für die Kodifikation im allgemeinen mit Bemerkungen über den neuen Entwurf deutschen bürgerlichen Gesetzbuches, Marburg 1889.
- Karl Dickel, Études sur le Nouveau Code Civil du Monténégro et sur l'importance des principes suivis par l'auteur de ce code en matiere de codification, 1891.
- Niko Martinović, Valtazar Bogišić I – Istorija kodifikacije crnogorskog imovinskog prava, Cetinje 1958.
- Carlos Petit, The Code and the Goats- Western Law in Less-Western Cultural Contexts – On the Code of Property of Montenegro. Zeitschrift für Neure Rechtgeschichte 1998, 212–224.
- Miloš Luković, Bogišićev zakonik, Beograd 2009.
