= Slavimo slavno, Slaveni! =

Choral composition by Franz Liszt

Slavimo Slavno, Slaveni! (Slavs, let's celebrate gloriously!), S.33, is a composition for male chorus and organ by Franz Liszt based on a work by the Dubrovnik poet Medo Pucić, composed for the Millennium celebration of the arrival of Slavic apostles Saint Cyril and Saint Methodius to the area of present-day Slovakia. The celebrations took place in Rome in July 1863, organized by Pope Pius IX; Liszt was personally present.

Liszt made arrangements of the choral piece for solo piano (S.503) and for organ (S.668).
