= Beyond Rejection =

1980 novel by Justin Leiber

First edition (publ. Del Rey Books) Cover art by Martin Hoffman

Beyond Rejection is a novel by Justin Leiber published in 1980.

== Plot summary ==
Beyond Rejection is a novel in which Ismael Forth dies from an accident and has his mind transferred into the mindless body of Sally Cadmus.

== Reception ==
Greg Costikyan reviewed Beyond Rejection in Ares Magazine #6 and commented that "On one level [...] Beyond Rejection is a fast-paced thriller; on another, it is a psychological novel detailing Forth's gradual acceptance of his new body; on still another, it is a superbly written and thoroughly civilized book."

== Reviews ==
- Review by Tom Easton (1981) in Analog Science Fiction/Science Fact, April 27, 1981
- Review by W. Ritchie Benedict [as by Ritchie Benedict] (1981) in Science Fiction Review, Fall 1981
- Review [French] by Claude Ecken (1986) in Fiction, #378
