= Encyclopedia of Motherhood =

- Author: Andrea O'Reilly
- Language: English
- Published: 2010
- Publication place: United States
- Media type: Print

The Encyclopedia of Motherhood is a comprehensive, specialized encyclopedia of all issues relevant to motherhood, published by SAGE Publications in three volumes (700 entries) in April 2010. Its general editor is Andrea O'Reilly.
