= Luka Primojević =

Ragusan nobleman and chancellor

- Other names: Luka Paskalis Primojević
- Occupation: scribe
- Known for: attempt to establish printing house in Dubrovnik in 1514

Luka Paskalis Primojević (Serbian: Лука Примојевић; Italian: Luca Pasquale de Primo) was an early 16th-century Ragusan nobleman and Serbian chancellor. He belonged to a noble Primojević family. His father Paskoje and brothers Trajan and Niko were also scribes. In March 1514 Luka requested from the Ragusan Senate an approval to establish a printing house in Dubrovnik and to print books in Latin, Greek and Cyrillic scripts. The Ragusan Senate gave its approval valid for one year. A year later he wrote a request to senate to prolong the validity of this approval for eight months.

== Family ==
Luka was born into noble Ragusan Primojević family (Italian: Primo). His father was Paskoje Primojević, a scribe for Slavic language in Ragusa in period between 1482 and 1527. Luka's brothers Trajan and Niko were also scribes in Ragusa, Trajan in period 1527-1537 and Niko in period 1536–1566.

== Attempt to establish a printing house ==
In his letter to Ragusan senate (Latin: Consilium rogatorum) he emphasized that he had intention to print books using the same letters used by Serbian priests in their churches, the same letters used in the Crnojević printing house which books were well respected and praised. In his letter to Senate he explained his intention to bring two printers from Italy to train local printers. Primojević also requested from Senate to allow him to import paper without any taxes, to designate a house and shop in the main square for Primojeivić to use and not to allow any other printer to install printing press in Ragusa for next 15 years. Ragusan senate accepted Primojević's requests under condition to establish printing press within one year. A year later Primojević asked Senate to postpone his deadline for eight months, which was accepted by the Senate on 13 March 1515. Although his intention to establish a printing house in Dubrovnik and to print Cyrillic books failed, his written statements left significant testimony about high reputation of the books printed in the Crnojević printing house.

As a scribe, Primojević used both unicursal and bicursal variant of letter ɣ. In 1517 Luka transcribed in Cyrillic a will of certain Ragusan citizen who wrote it in 1512, also in Cyrillic. In 1531 document Luka's brother, Trajan, used the same version of ɣ letter used by his brother Luka.
