= Justin Leiber =

American novelist

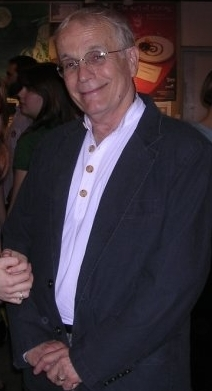
- Born: Justin Fritz Leiber; July 10, 1938; Chicago, Illinois, U.S.
- Died: March 22, 2016 (aged 77); Tallahassee, Florida, U.S.
- Spouse: Barbara R. Foorman (m. 1957; div. 1960)
- Children: 2, including ArLynn

Philosophical work
- Era: Contemporary
- Region: Western philosophy
- Main interests: Cognitive science; linguistics

Justin Fritz Leiber (/ˈlaɪbər/ LY-bər; July 8, 1938 – March 22, 2016) was an American philosopher and science fiction writer. He was the son of fantasy, horror and science fiction author Fritz Leiber and the grandson of stage and film actor Fritz Leiber, Sr. Previously a professor of philosophy at the University of Houston, Leiber was most recently a professor emeritus of philosophy at Florida State University. He was a visiting fellow at Linacre College, Oxford during the Trinity term on numerous occasions.

== Early life ==
Leiber was born in 1938 in Chicago to writers Fritz Leiber and Jonquil Stephens Leiber. After completing his primary and secondary schooling at the University of Chicago Laboratory Schools, he went on to receive A.B. (1958), A.M. (1960) and Ph.D. (1967) degrees in philosophy from the University of Chicago and a B.Phil (1972) from St. Catherine's College, Oxford.

Leiber had two children, attorney and novelist ArLynn Leiber Presser and singer and actor KC Leiber.

== Career ==
Leiber had numerous academic appointments, including an instructorship at Memphis State University (1962–1963) and assistant professorships at Utica College of Syracuse University (1963–1965), the State University of New York at Buffalo (1966–1968) and Lehman College (1968–1977). While at the latter institution, he held visiting appointments at King's College London (honorary visitor; 1970–1971), St. Catherine's College, Oxford (philosophy tutor; 1971–1972) and the Massachusetts Institute of Technology (visiting scientist; 1976–1978). A full professor at the University of Houston from 1978 onward, Leiber ended his career at Florida State University.

== Death ==
Leiber died on March 22, 2016, in Tallahassee, Florida, from prostate cancer.

== Works ==
Leiber's publications encompass a number of subjects, including philosophy, psychology, linguistics, and cognitive science. He published several papers on Alan Turing's Turing test and Turing's mathematical Turing machines and biological achievements, arguing that Turing Test passage requires actual, real time, reliable passage, thus excluding challenges to the Test by John Searle and others (Leiber 2006a, 1995, 1991). He also defends Turing's demand for a biology that excludes selectionist and functional explanations (Leiber 2006a, 2001) and he has offered a related critique of evolutionary psychology (Leiber 2008, 2006b). In several works (Leiber 1991,1988, 1975) he articulates the nativist and rationalist linguistics of Noam Chomsky. In a critical notice of Leiber's Invitation to Cognitive Science, Diane Proudfoot and Jack Copeland comment that "He provides a rationale for the Turing test which knits together the motivational remarks of Turing's 1950 article more satisfyingly than any previously proposed and he draws attention to Turing's anticipation of connectionism in 1948." While acknowledging that Leiber's interpretation of Turing's 1936 paper is widely shared, they argue that this consensus "distorts both Turing's achievement and the epistemic status of the computational theory of mind." Proudfoot and Copeland also comment that "Leiber upsets the common view of Wittgenstein by arguing that theses in the Philosophical Investigations commit Wittgenstein to a scientific approach the mind and encourage a specifically computational theory of mind...[stressing] central elements of Wittgenstein's constructive accounts of mind and language." However, they are critical of Leiber's audacious interpretation.

Some of both his fiction and non-fiction books and papers have dealt with intelligence and consciousness. Larry Hauser credits Leiber's dialogue, Can Animals and Machines Be Persons? for articulating the claim that "the solipsistic predicament pertains to individuals not species," so that if one can reliably tell that other humans have minds it would be sheer chauvinism to maintain one could never know whether something non-human had a mind. Lesley McLean comments that "Justin Leiber, who Dennett cites as a source for exposing certain hidden agendas distorting objective research into animal consciousness, himself offers a subjective account for why indeed we might doubt the link between moral standing and having of a mind [Leiber 1988]...What is interesting is that neither Descartes nor Leiber thinks animals to be conscious, yet they nevertheless think them worthy of moral consideration." Peter Singer, Mary Midgley, and others cite L. C. Rosenfield's From Beast-Machine to Man-Machine: Animal Soul in French Letters from Descartes to LaMettrie (New York, Oxford University Press, 1941) for a ghastly account of animal cruelty by unnamed Cartesians, but Singer and the rest fail to mention that Rosenfield dismisses the account as a pious anti-Cartesian fabrication, and further, that Rosenfield maintains that Descartes himself was never accused of cruelty to animals, nor did Descartes maintain that animals could not feel pain (Leiber 1988).

Begun while he was a visiting scientist at MIT, Justin Leiber's first novel, Beyond Rejection, starts with a lengthy description of a “mind implant” operation in which the software mind of one individual is inserted into the hardware brain and body of another. Provocative and detailed, the description has been anthologized in several text books, most notably in Douglas Hofstadter and Daniel Dennett's The Mind's I. The novel's protagonist, with memories of a male body, awakens to a female one and must find a way beyond rejection. In Beyond Humanity, the protagonist deals with the claims to personhood of both apes and computers – themes that Hackett Publishing suggested might also be incorporated into a dialogue, Can Animals and Machines Be Persons? In Beyond Gravity, Leiber's protagonist discovers that earth has long been studied by alien “anthropologists,” who write articles about humans which appear in a journal whose title might be translated into humanese as “Primitivity Review.” As this description suggests, Leiber's Beyond trilogy is largely taken up with issues in philosophy and cognitive science. The same might not be said of Leiber's sword and sorcery novels The Sword and the Eye and The Sword and the Tower.

=== Bibliography ===
==== Fiction ====
- Beyond Rejection. New York: Book Club Hardcover (Doubleday). 1980.
- The Sword and the Eye. New York: Thomas Doherty Associates. 1985.
- The Sword and the Tower. New York: Thomas Doherty Associates. 1986.
- Beyond Humanity. New York: Thomas Doherty Associates. 1987.
- Beyond Gravity. New York: Thomas Doherty Associates. 1988.

==== Non-fiction books ====
- Noam Chomsky: A Philosophic Overview. Boston: G. K. Hall. 1975.
- Structuralism: Skepticism and Mind in the Psychological Sciences. Boston: G. K. Hall. 1978.
- Can Animals and Machines Be Persons?. Cambridge, Massachusetts: Hackett Publishing. 1986.
- An Invitation to Cognitive Science. Oxford: Blackwell. 1991.
- Paradoxes. London: Duckworth. 1993.

==== Some non-fiction papers ====
- "The Wiles of Evolutionary Psychology and the Indeterminacy of Selection" Philosophical Forum, 2008, 39:1, 53–72.
- "Turing’s Golden," Philosophical Psychology, 2006a, 19:4, 13–46.
- "Instinctive Incest Avoidance: A Paradigm Case for Evolutionary Psychology Evaporates." Journal For The Theory of Social Behavior, 2006b, 36:4, 369–388.
- "Turing and the Fragility and Insubstantiality of Evolutionary Explanations: A Puzzle About the Unity of Alan Turing's Work with some Larger Implications, 2001, Philosophical Psychology, XIII. 83-94.
- "On What Sort of Speech Act Wittgenstein’s Investigations Is and Why It Matters," The Philosophical Forum 1997, XXVIII, no. 3, 232–267.
- "Nature's Experiments, Society's Closures," The Journal for the Theory of Social Behaviour,1997, XXVII, 325–343.
- "Art, Pornography, and the Evolution of Consciousness," in Alan Soble, ed., Sex, Love, and Friendship, 1997, Amsterdam/Atlanta: Editions Rodopi.
- "On Turing's Turing Test and Why the Matter Matters," Synthese, 1995,104:1, 59–69.
- "Cartesian" Linguistics?," Philosophia, 1988, 309-46. Subsequently reprinted, with minor corrections, in The Chomskyan Turn, Oxford: Blackwell, 1991.
- "Fritz Leiber and Eyes," Starship 35, 1979.
