= Judith Pordon =

American poet, writer, and poetry editor (born 1954)

Judith Grace Pordon (born 1954) is an American poet, writer, and poetry editor. Some of her more well known poems include, How Will You Kiss?, Expiration, and At The Top Of The Food Chain But The Bottom Of The Line.

== Life ==
Judith Grace Pordon was born in Atlanta, Georgia. Her mother, Eleanor Haggett Pordon, left an administrative and scientific career in chemistry to raise her children and was Judith's principal muse.

At age five, her family moved from Georgia to suburban Boston. Her high school education was completed in Concord, Massachusetts, a few blocks from Thoreau's Walden Pond. She graduated from New College of California in 1978.

== Poetry ==
Her early poems, in the 1970s and 1980s, explored various themes including contact with nature, and social criticism. In the 1990s she was befriended and mentored by Aemilia Laracuen, artist and primary muse of poet Robert Graves, who encouraged her to seek publication.

After writing poetry for 30 years, she began submitting her work to literary journals. In her first year her work was published in over two dozen journals, including Chiron Review, Tulane Review, Writers Journal, Buffalo Bones, The Rockford Review, The Ledge, The Orange Willow Review, VLQ, Black Bear Review, and The American Dissident.

Poetry anthologies such as Many Mountains Moving (on Spirituality), The Austin International Poetry Festival Anthology (both in 1999 and in 2001) and Uno have published her poems.

She has also been published in dozens of poetry e-zines including The 2River View, Agnieska's Dowry, Stirring, Poetry Super Highway, Poetic Voices, Recursive Angel, ZeroZine, Facets Magazine, Southern Ocean Review, and Verse Libre.

Her first screenplay was completed in 1993. Her first book of poems, The Body Speaks, was completed in 1999, and her second, The Long Way Home, was published in 2002.

Future works, currently in progress, include a book on creativity, several more books of poetry, and a multigenerational family memoir.

== Commissions and recognition ==
In 2001, she was commissioned by Andrew Levin of Clemson University Music Department to write lyrics for an operatic composition, Flourishing True which was performed in the winter of 2002 at the 10th anniversary of the Brooks Center at Clemson University.

She is listed in The Who's Who of American Women, and The Who's Who of the World.

== Poetry editor ==
Since 2001, she has been the editor of an [online international poetry anthology] is a widely read website on anti-war poems, nature poetry, poems of loss and grieving, spiritual poetry, women poets, and poems in Spanish. She has helped popularize many contemporary poets including David Shumate, Lola Haskins, Quentin Huff, Susan Dane, Bill Mohr, Scott Wiggerman, Gaston Ng, and Marilyn Krysl.
