= Motherhood Initiative for Research and Community Involvement =

Canadian research and advocacy group

The Motherhood Initiative for Research and Community Involvement (MIRCI) is a Canadian scholarly research and advocacy group for mothering-motherhood.

== Background ==
MIRCI identifies its mandate as:

A forum for the discussion and dissemination of research on motherhood, and to establish a community of individuals and institutions working and researching in the area of mothering and motherhood… to promote, showcase, and make visible maternal scholarship and accord legitimacy to the academic field. Most importantly, MIRCI exists to provide a community for like-minded scholars who research and work in the area of mothering and motherhood.

The central activities carried out by MIRCI are published scholarly journals and works, and holding international conferences. Regular motherhood Conferences hosted by MIRCI are held in Canada and have also been held in many other locations across the globe including Ireland, Italy, Greece, Barbados, Portugal, Puerto Rico, Massachusetts, Wisconsin and New York City in the USA. A sister organisation, AMIRCI, also hosts regular conferences in Australia. MIRCI houses many published scholarly journals and works, most notably the Journal of the Motherhood Initiative (JMI, formerly The Journal of the Association for Research on Mothering), and houses the International Mothers Network, The Young Mothers Empowerment Project, and The Motherhood Studies Forum. MIRCI is partnered with independent feminist publishing press, Demeter Press, which was also founded by Andrea O'Reilly.

== History ==
Founded in 1998 by Andrea O'Reilly through York University, Toronto, MIRCI was initially called 'The Association for Research on Mothering' (ARM). In 2010, the name was changed to MIRCI. The Australian sister organisation, founded by Marie Porter, was originally named ARM-A, and was also renamed to AMIRCI in 2010.

== Publications ==
=== Most recent issues of the 'Journal of the Motherhood Initiative' ===
Downe, P., Boland, B., Wong, G., et al., 2018, 'Pregnancy, Childbirth, and Post-Partum', Journal of the Motherhood Initiative (MIRCI), Volume 9. Green, F., Weappa, J., Epstein, S., et al., 2018, 'Motherlines', Journal of the Motherhood Initiative (MIRCI), Volume 9.1.

Downe, P., Gamber, C., O'Reilly, A., et al., 2017, 'Mothers and Mothering in Today's World', Journal of the Motherhood Initiative (MIRCI), Volume 8.1, 8.2

Jordan, N., Greenway, K., Epstein., et al., 2016, 'Maternal Subjectivities', Journal of the Motherhood Initiative (MIRCI), Volume 7.

Byrd, D., O'Reilly, A., Mercer., et al., 2016, 'Mothers, Mothering and Motherhood in Literature', Journal of the Motherhood Initiative (MIRCI), Volume 7.1.

Guignard, F., Esnard, T., Dobson, K., et al., 2015, 'Mothers in the Academe', Journal of the Motherhood Initiative (MIRCI), Volume 6.2.

Peterson, E., Martin, B., Hill, N., et al., 2015, 'Communicating Motherhood/Mothers Communicating in Popular Culture and Social Media', Journal of the Motherhood Initiative (MIRCI), Volume 6.1.

=== Other notable publications ===
O'Reilly, A, 2004, Mother Outlaws: Theories and Practices of Empowered Mothering, Demeter Press, York University, UK.
