= Pucić family =

Noble family of the Republic of Ragusa

Pucić Pozza
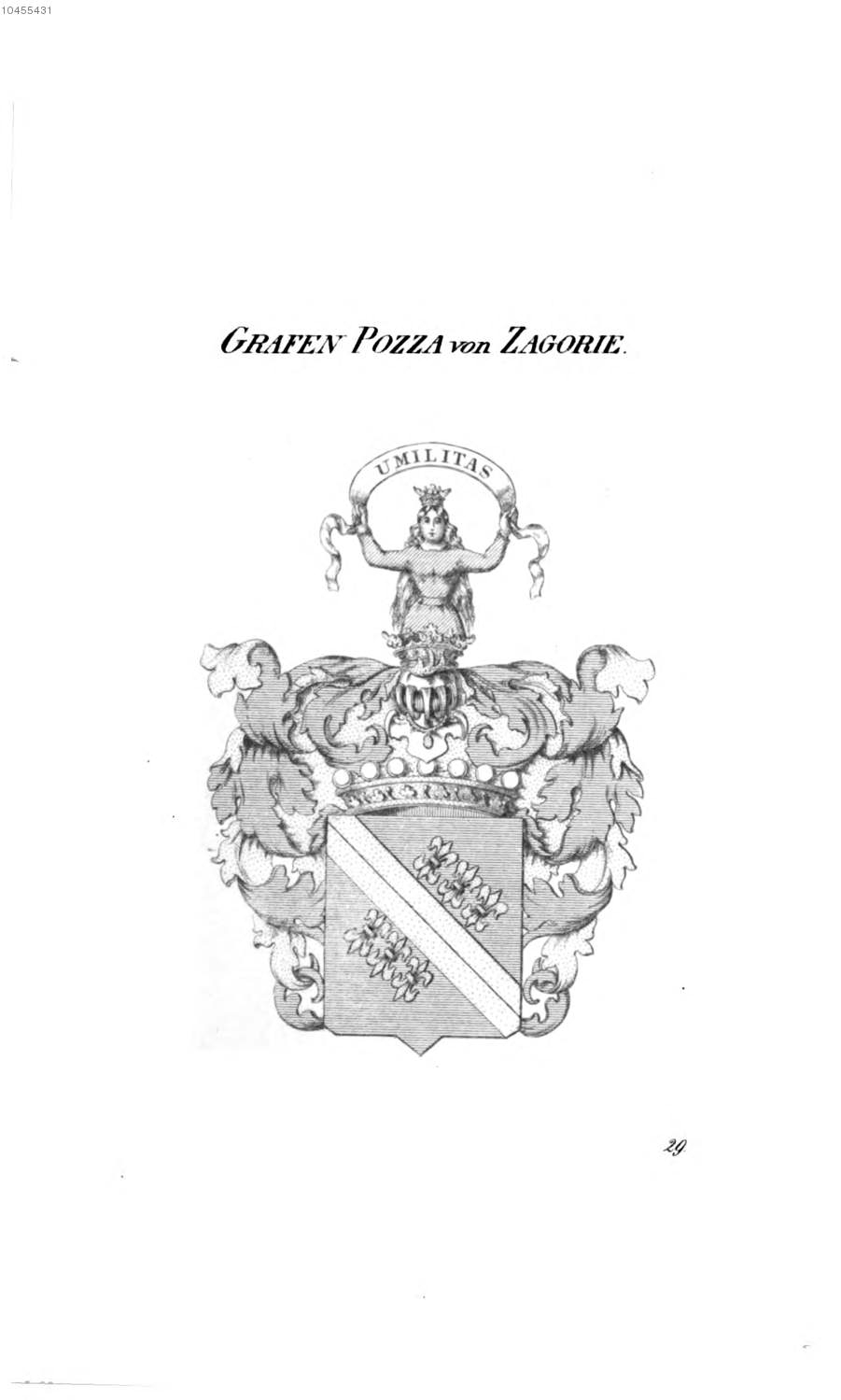
- Country: Republic of Ragusa
- Founded: 20 September 1688
- Founder: Matej Pucić
- Titles: Count

The House of Pucić, known also as Pozza in Italian, is a noble family from the Republic of Ragusa.

== History ==
The family can trace their ancestry from 1253. The Emperor Leopold I, granted the title of Count and the predicate "de Zagorie" on 20 September 1688 to Matej Pucić, son of Lucijan Pucić and his wife, Marija Bunić. They are considered to have been one of the most prestigious families of the Republic of Ragusa, which intermarried with most powerful families of the Ragusan nobility.

== Genealogy ==
Nikola (Niko) Pucić

Niko Mali Pucić

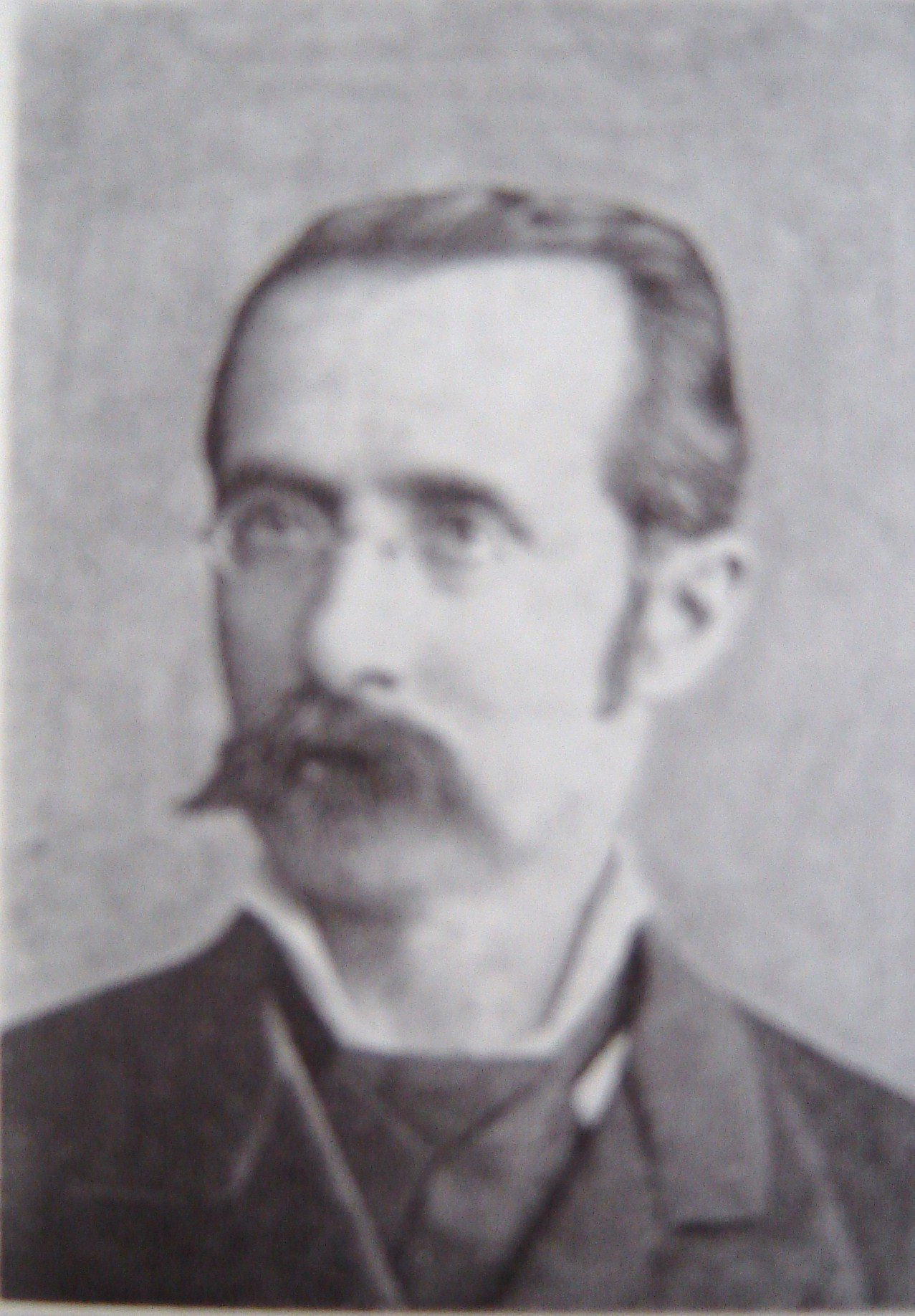
Rafael (Rafo) Pucić

Helena von Ziegler-Pucić

- Matej Pucić (born in 1708) and Marija Bunić had two sons:
  - Lucijan Pucić (died 1752), had a son Mattäus (died childless in 1771, in Vienna)
  - Nikola Mateo Pucić (11 August 1684 – 1745), married Magdalena Gučetić on 1 November 1727. They had three sons.
- Mateo Nikola Pucić (21 June 1728–c. 1801), married Marija Magdalena Vincenca Bondić (born 14 April 1738) in Dubrovnik on 17 April 1768. Their sons were:
  - Nikola Dominko Pucić (22 October 1771 – 1818), unmarried
  - Marin Mateo Pucić (6 September 1774–c. 1818), unmarried
  - Marina Pucić, date of birth and death unknown.
  - Marija Pucić, date of birth and death unknown, married Nikola Pucić.
  - Lucijan Jakov Dominik Vincenc Pucić (born 20 August 1780), married with Marina Marija Antonia Alojzija Sorkočević (born 13 September 1795). Attained first confirmation of his old aristocracy after the fall of the Republic of Dubrovnik, on 1 December 1817, the other two Pucić received their confirmation of their k.k. nobility 30 November 1817 and all three together again 28 November 1818 . They had two sons:
    - Matej Lucijan Pucić
    - Marija Domenika Pucić (3 August 1820 – 21 April 1866), who married with Wenzel Ritter von Ziegler (k.k Landesgeriches) born in Graz 11 October 1810 and died in Trieste 4 September 1896. They had one son:
      - Lucijan von Ziegler-Pucić (born in Kotor, on 19 March 1852 and died on 8 September 1930 in Dubrovnik), married Countess Ana-Marija Enriketa Lujza Kabudžić on 20 June 1858, died in 1944 in Szombathely, Hungary. They were married in Dubrovnik on 10 April 1882 and had three children:
        - Helena von Ziegler-Pucić (born in Pula on 3 March 1889 and died in Baden, Viena on 2 February 1968), married Hugo Theobald Alfons Karl Maria Freiherr von Seyffertitz, (KorvKpt. i. R) who was born in Brixen 23 September 1885 and died in Baden, Viena, on 10 June 1966.
        - Teo von Ziegler-Pucić (date of birth unknown, died in Yugoslavia on 24 November 1924) married Marica von Kiepach-Haselburg (born in Križevci, Croatia, c.1897). After the death of Teo, she moved to Los Angeles, California, and died there in 1985.
        - Marica von Ziegler-Pucić (born in Pula, on 10 January 1885 and died in Acsád, Hungary, on 2 February 1964) married with Charley Masjon (a Linienschiffskapitän), who was born in Graz, on 19 November 1871 and died in 1950, in Táplánszentkereszt, Hungary. They had one daughter, Winifred Masjon, who was born in Pula on June 8, 1911, and died in Keszthely. She married László Harkay (Colonel) and lived in Hungary.
- Lucijan Nikola Pucić (1735 –1813), married Descae Sorkočević, they had two sons:
  - Nikola Lucijan Pucić (born 29 May 1772 and died on 9 September 1855, in Vienna 1855), he was one of the last senators of the Republic of Dubrovnik, and married with Helene Maria Ragnina (1786–1865) from Dubrovnik, she was a famous musician, They had two children:
    - Marina Pucić, (born 25 March 1826, death unknown), married Matej Natali on 4 August 1866.
    - Lucijan, date of birth and death unknown.
- Magdalena Pucić (date of birth and death unknown) married Šišmundo Đivo Sorkočević. She received the authorization for the usage of the name with the coat of arms: "Pucić-Sorkočević de Zagorie" on 8 December 1806 by testament from her mother's line, from grandfather Marko Đivo Nobil Sorkočević 1 December 1817 the ennobling and as k. k. Nobile and 28 November 1818 the k. k. aristocracy confirmation with the count conditions were met.
- Nikola Ignjat Pucić (born 30 July 1741), married Ana Sorkočević on 17 January 1783. They had four children:
  - Nikola Alojz Dominko Pucić (12 July 1783 – 13 January 1857), married 1816 with Magdalena Gučetić (born 7 August 1792). They had six children.
    - Nikola Sever (born 25 January 1825)
- Ana Pucić (born 11 December 1853), married Savo Đurđević (13 June 1806 – 9 November 1876, he remarried 5 November 1859 with Fransizca Freiin Meingarten (1831–9 May 1876), Ana and Savo had one daughter:
  - Magdalena Đurđević (20 January 1852, she married in Modena, on 25 May 1878 with Baron Augusto Mayneri from Turin. They had two children: Margherita Mayneri, born in 1879, Ragusa and Felice Luciano Nicola Mayneri,(regio Commissario Civile Italiano a Ragusa) born 26 February 1881, Ragusa. murder 11 November 1943, Korčula, Orebić (Curzola-Sabbioncello).
- Rafael Pucić, lawyer and Mayor of Dubrovnik (was elected 5 times, in the years 1869, 1872, 1875, 1882 and 1884) and elected two times into the Dalmatian Parliament (1870, 1876). He was born 29 February 1828 and died on 4 November 1890 in Vienna.
- Marina Pucić
- Marko Pucić (born 13 June 1831)
- Magdalena Pucić (born 13 January 1854) who married with Nikola Gradi. (1825–1894), who was k.k Kamemerer and tribunalrath of Kotor.
  - Marko Alojz Dominko Pucić (17 June 1785 – 1 January 1864), married Ana Bondić (the sister of Count Marin Bondić), who died October 6, 1855, in Dubrovnik. They had four children:
    - Niko Pucić (1822–1883)
    - Medo Pucić (1821–1882)
    - Nikola Paskval Pucić was born 18 May 1825 (k.k Mayor officer) and died on 13 March 1882, in Gruz.
    - Ana Pucić (born 9 August 1823), married 7 February 1858 with Dr Marin Đurđević (1824–1897) in 1857.
  - Matej Baltazar (born 17 June 1787), died unmarried.
  - Lucijan Toma Natal Maro Frano (born 16 June 1795), died unmarried. On 1 December 1817, the k. k. Ennobling and as Nobili and 28 November 1818 the k. k. Confirmation of the count conditions were received. The three sons already mentioned of Matej (I.), the son Lucijans (II.) in addition and the four sons of the Nikola Ignjat received on 23 May 1819, a k again a confirmation of count status.

== Coat of arms ==
- Pucić v. Zagorie. Blue with two gold cotices, alongside six fleurs-de-lys same, posed each one bars some, lines in bands, the ecu bordered in rhombus of mouths. Crowned helmet.
- Pucić-Sorkočević de Zagorie - Left: Blue with two gold cotices, alongside of six fleurs-de-lys same posed each one bars some, lines of bands (Pucić); right: bendy red and blue of eight parts (Sorkočević).
Coat of Arms of the Pucić noble family, variation

Coat of Arms of the Pucić noble family, variation

== The Pucić brothers ==
Medo Pucić and Niko Pucić were two important figures in Croatian and Serbian politics in the 19th century; Medo fought for the unification of Dalmatia (then under direct Austrian rule) with the rest of Croatia. Niko Pucić was an important politician and Pan-Slavic nationalist.

== See also ==
- Republic of Ragusa
- Dubrovnik
- Medo Pucić
- Niko Pucić
- Elena Pucić-Sorkočević (born Ranjina)
- Dalmatia

== Sources ==
- Gothaisches Genealogisches Taschenbuch Gräfliche Häuser B, 1864, 1920: Pucić de Zagorie
- HEYER v. ROSENFELD, Carl Georg - "Der Adel des Königreichs Dalmatien", in Siebmacher Bd. IV, 3. Abteilung, Nürnberg 1873. - Pucić de Zagorie (Skatić; Skatich) - Seite 19, 74, Tafel 13
- The Pozza family

== Gallery ==
The genealogy of the Pucić family

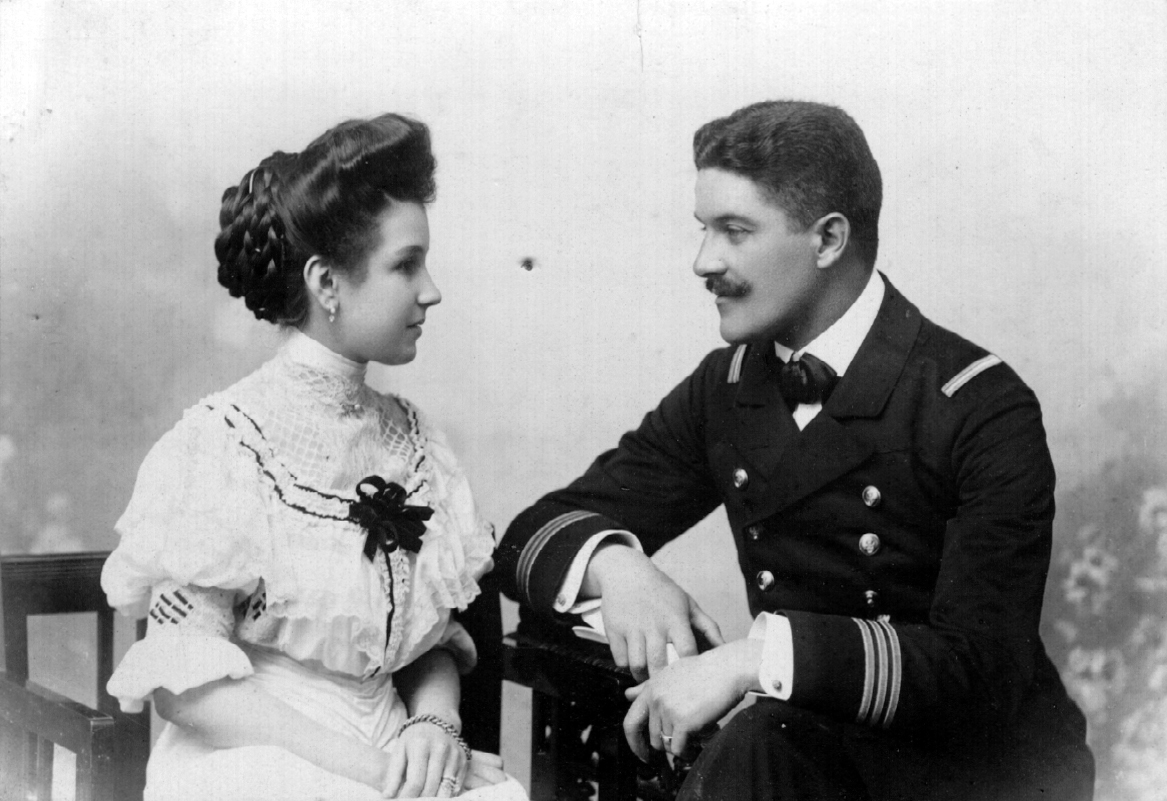
Marica and Charles Masjon, 1905

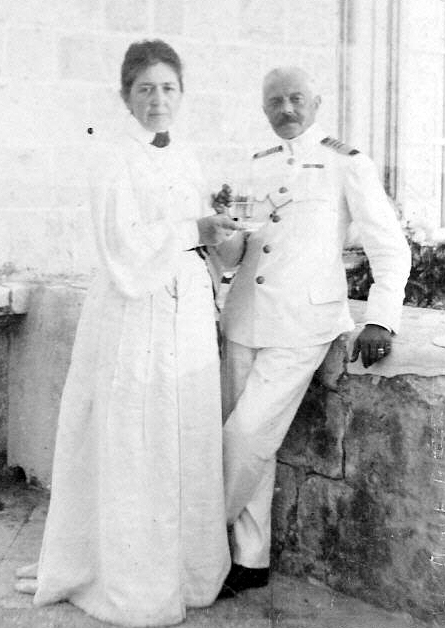
Ana Kaboga and Lucijan von Ziegler-Pucić

House Pucić-Gradić, Gruž

House Pucić-Gradić, Gruž

Maria Giorgi-Pozza tombs, Sv.Mihajlo, Lapad

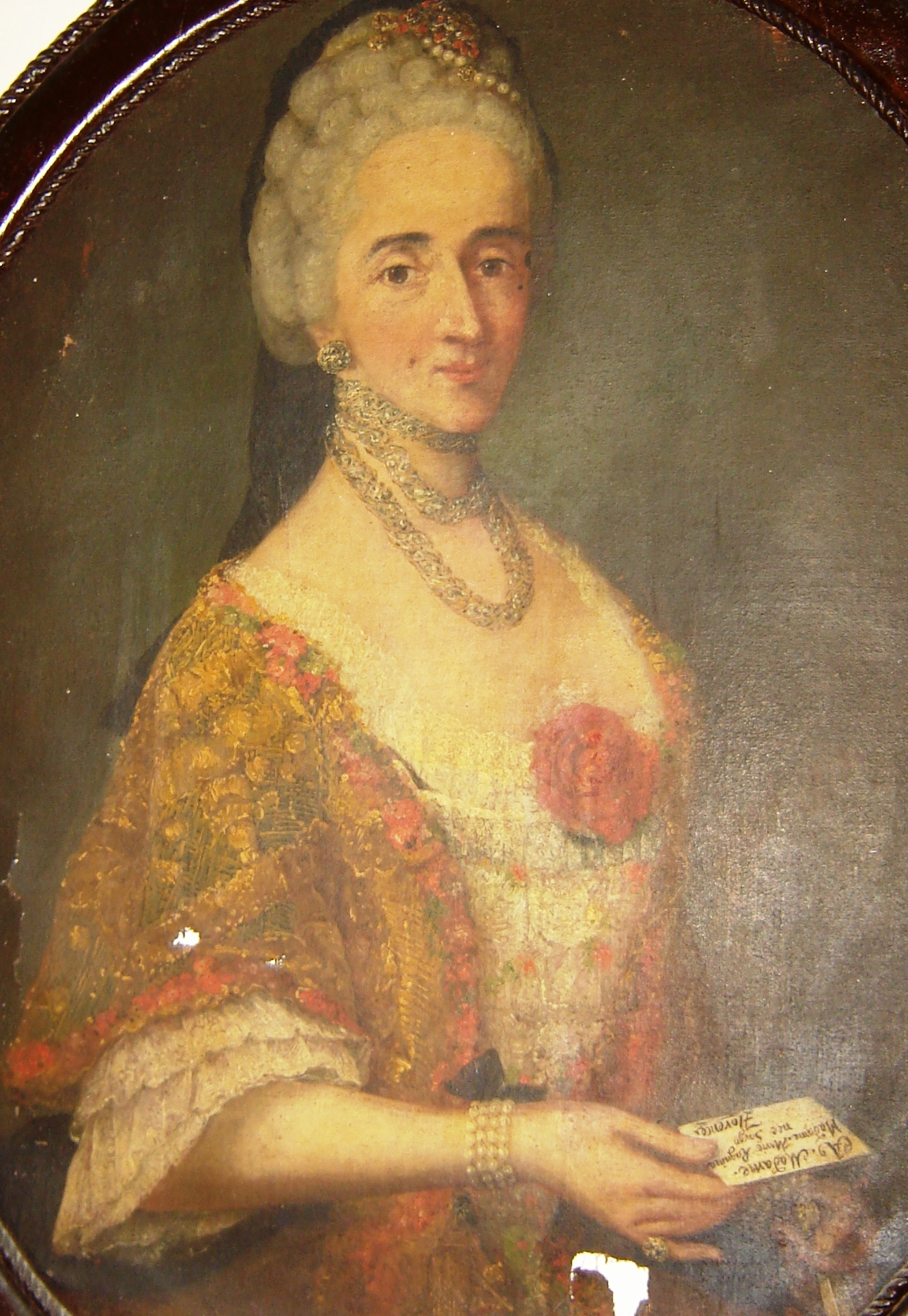
Elena Pucić-Sorkočević (Ragnina)
