= Niko Pucić =

Writer and politician (1820–1883)

- Born: February 5, 1820; Dubrovnik
- Died: April 13, 1883 (aged 63)
- Occupations: politician, writer
- Writing career
- Pen name: Niko Veliki Pucić
- Notable work: Journal Slovinac

Young Niko Pucić

Niko Pucić de Zagorien (also Nicola Pozza in Italian; February 5, 1820 – April 13, 1883) was a writer and politician from an old Ragusan noble family.

== Biography ==
He was born in Dubrovnik in 1820. He was the brother of Medo Pucić, another well-known politician.

Pucić gave up his studies and started living from in Dubrovnik from 1838 because of his father's illness. He ran the family's accounts, often undertaking long journeys. Like his brother Medo, he maintained relations with the representatives of the political and cultural life in the monarchy, particularly in Croatia.

After 1860 Pucić became an active representative of the national movement in Dalmatia. The Dalmatian and Croatian state parliament delegates sent Pucić in 1861, as their representative, to Vienna, where he attempted to convince the Imperial Court of the need to unify the two kingdoms.

From 1867 to 1869 Pucić was vice-president of the Dalmatian Parliament. Afterwards he withdrew from politics and took part only in the region's culture life.

Pucić was the first editor of the Serbian Catholic movement newspaper Dubrovnik and one of the founders of the 1878 newspaper Slovinac. He was the best friend of Serbian Catholic movement leader jurist Valtazar Bogisic.

== See also ==
- Republic of Ragusa
- House of Pucić
- Serb-Catholic movement in Dubrovnik
