= Margaret Parton =

American journalist

Margaret Parton (1915 – 1981) was an American author, critic, and journalist. Her parents were journalists, prominent in their day: Lemuel F. Parton, and Mary Field Parton. Her career was long and eventful, including a great deal of crime and foreign reporting, and contact with many influential personalities in literary, political and legal affairs. From the mid 1940s, she was a beat writer for the New York Herald Tribune in Asia, working first in India and later in Japan.

Her three autobiographical works were Laughter on the Hill, 1945, which dealt with her Bohemian experiences in San Francisco; The Leaf and the Flame describing her experience as a journalist in India at the time of the assassination of Mahatma Gandhi; and her final autobiography: Journey Through A Lighted Room 1973 An extensive collection of her papers is accessible at the University of Oregon Libraries, Special Collections and University Archives: Margaret Parton papers.
