= ArLynn Leiber Presser =

American writer (born 1960)

- Born: ArLynn Merrill Leiber; July 23, 1960 (age 66); Chicago
- Education: Northwestern University School of Law
- Occupations: Writer, attorney
- Spouse: Stephen B. Presser (m. 1987 - div. 2010)
- Relatives: Justin Leiber (father); Fritz Leiber, Jr. (grandfather)
- Writing career
- Pen name: Lynn Melody Patrick (adopted name); Vivian Leiber (writing name)
- Language: English

ArLynn Leiber Presser (born July 23, 1960) is an American writer and former attorney, known for writing under the name Vivian Leiber. She initially wrote for confessional magazines such as True Story while still working within the legal field. Presser later left her practice and began writing romance novels, regional histories, and plays.

In 2010 Pressler began a project called The Face to Facebook Project (also stylized as f2fb) in which she pledged that she would meet and spend time with each of her 325 friends on Facebook during 2011. She maintained a blog and traveled to various different countries and cities, managing to establish contact with 290 of her Facebook friends.

== Background ==
Presser was born on July 23, 1960, to Justin and Aleta Leiber, who later put her up for adoption before divorcing. Presser was later adopted by Donald and Judy Patrick of Western Springs and given the name Lynn Melody Patrick. She left the Patrick family when she was 15 and became a ward of the DuPage County Juvenile Justice agency.

Presser did not finish high school, but graduated from the Northwestern University School of Law in 1985.

She married legal scholar Stephen B. Presser, and they had two sons together before divorcing in 2010.

== Bibliography ==
- Casey's Flyboy (1991)
- Goody Two Shoes (1992)
- Her Own Prince Charming (1992)
- Second to None (1994)
- The Romantics (1994)
- Safety of His Arms (1995)
- Getting Out: Emily (1995)
- Baby Makes Nine (1995)
- Love Changes Everything (1995)
- Blue-Jeaned Prince (1996)
- Marrying Nicky (1996)
- The Bewildered Wife (1997)
- How to Marry a Million Dollar Man (1997)
- Always a Hero (1997)
- His Kind of Trouble (1997)
- An Ordinary Day (1998)
- The 6’2”, 200 lb. Challenge (1998)
- His Betrothed (1998)
- Soldier and the Society Girl (1999)
- The Marriage Merger (1999)
- Secret Daddy (1999)
- One Sexy Daddy (1999)
- Three Wishes – Men of Sugar Mountain Series (2000)
- Landslide (2000)
- One Touch – Men of Sugar Mountain Series (2000)
- Two Hearts – Men of Sugar Mountain Series (2002)
- The Lipstick Chronicles (2002)
- More Lipstick Chronicles (2004)
- The Ghost Light (2006)
- Murder at LaFayette Square (2007)
- My Father's Country, Not My Own (2009)
- The Archivist (2009)
- Winnetka (2009)
- Kearney (2010)
- Northfield (2011)
- face2facebook (2013)
- Cut Like Diamonds (2013)
- Mrs Vandor Leyden's Glasses (2013)
- Cherries In The Snow (2013)
- Remembrance - 2 Act Play (2016)
- Napier's Constant (2021)
- This One Last Palmer's Kiss (2022)
- Your Book of Days (2024)

== Awards ==
- 1995 Romance Writers of America's RITA Award for Best Young Adult Romance for Second to None
- 1997 Romantic Times' Reviewer's Choice Award for His Kind of Trouble
- 2007 Illinois Arts Council's Literary Award for The Ghost Light
