= Edward Pollock =

American poet

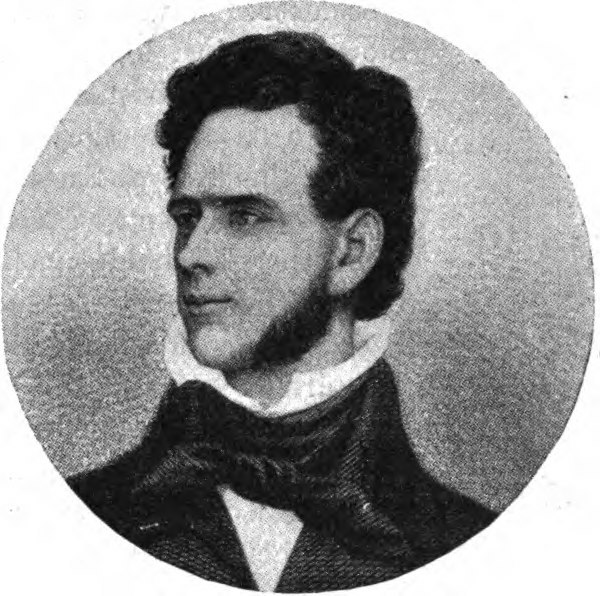
Edward Pollock

Edward Pollock (September 2, 1823 Philadelphia – December 13, 1858) was an American poet best known for writing "The Parting Hour" in 1857.

== Life ==
He worked as a child in a cotton factory. He apprenticed with a sign-painter. In 1852, he moved to San Francisco, California, and became a contributor to the Pioneer magazine. He studied law and was admitted as an attorney at the California Supreme Court in 1866. He died in 1865

In his book A First Book of Jurisprudence for Students of the Common Law he wrote:

There is no way by which modern law can escape from the scientific and artificial character imposed on it by the demand of modern societies for full, equal and exact justice.

== Works ==
- Edward Pollock (1876). James F. Bowman (ed.). Poems. J.B. Lippincott & Co.
