= Demeter Press =

Canadian academic publisher

- Founded: 2006
- Founder: Andrea O'Reilly
- Country of origin: Canada
- Headquarters location: Ontario
- Publication types: Books, journals
- Nonfiction topics: humanities and social sciences
- Official website: demeterpress.org

Demeter Press is a not-for-profit feminist academic publisher headquartered in Ontario, Canada. Founded in 2006 by Andrea O'Reilly, it focuses on the topic of motherhood and is partnered with the Motherhood Initiative for Research and Community Involvement (MIRCI), formerly the Association for Research on Mothering at York University. It is named in honour of the goddess Demeter.
