= Marie Porter =

Australian women and children's advocate

Marie Porter AM (born 4 November 1939) is a researcher, writer and advocate for the welfare of women and children. She founded the Australian Motherhood Initiative for Research and Community Involvement (AMIRCI) in 2001. In her role as founder and chairperson of AMIRCI, Porter has presided over multiple international conferences held in Australia. These events are attended by a network of academics, postgraduate students, artists, health professionals and lawyers.

Porter has also been an active advocate in the field of disability and was instrumental in the establishment of several organisations focused on the severely physically disabled including Friends of Brain Injured Children in 1977, the Mamre Association (respite care for parents of disabled people) in 1983 and NIRAN Inc (permanent residential accommodation for severely disabled adults) in 1990.

== Education and career ==
Porter originally trained as a teacher and worked in education until she was forced to resign in 1962 as a result of the marriage bar. Over several decades Dr Porter was then primary carer for her severely physically disabled son with fragile health. During this period she completed her Bachelor of Arts. Porter has described her struggles during this time:

I was in my early 40s and a mother to three boys. My 12-year-old Anthony was totally physically handicapped. The specialists told me he’d never live to age one. But I made up my mind that wasn’t going to be the case. . . . We worked so hard. Not just me, the whole family. I got to the stage where I couldn’t sleep at all and I could hardly think clearly. I once put on a dress back-to-front and wondered why it looked strange.

After completing her Phd she continued her research and lecturing. She organised the inaugural course on motherhood at the University of Queensland : HUMN2001: The Mother: Images, Issues and Practices. Porter's 2008 publication, ‘’Transformative Power in Motherwork’’, was based on her 2006 PhD thesis, which received the Dean's commendation from the University of Queensland. Since then she has published numerous texts on motherhood and has lectured internationally on this topic. Through setting up of AMIRCI she has provided an avenue for many others to present and publish research in this emerging field.

== Awards ==
Dr Porter was made a Member of the Order of Australia (AM) in the 2018 Queen's Birthday Honours.

== Works ==
- Australian International Academic Conference on Motherhood (1st : 2001 : University of Queensland); Porter, Marie, 1938-; O'Reilly, Andrea, 1961-; Short, Patricia, 1950- (2005), Motherhood : power and oppression, Women's Press, ISBN 978-0-88961-454-3
- Porter, Marie (2008), Transformative power in motherwork : a study of mothering in the 1950s and 1960s, Cambridge Scholars Publishing, ISBN 978-1-84718-550-1
- Australian Conference on Mothering (2005 : University of Queensland, Australia); Porter, Marie, 1938-, (editor of compilation.); Kelso, Julie, 1970-, (editor of compilation.) (2008), Theorising and representing maternal realities, Cambridge Scholars, ISBN 978-1-84718-456-6
- Porter, Marie, 1938-; Kelso, Julie, 1970- (2010), Mother-texts : narratives and counter-narratives, Cambridge Scholars, ISBN 978-1-4438-2332-6
- Raith, Lisa, (editor.); Jones, Jenny, 1954-, (editor.); Porter, Marie, 1938-, (editor.) (2015), Mothers at the margins : stories of challenge, resistance and love, Newcastle upon Tyne Cambridge Scholars Publishing, ISBN 978-1-4438-7235-5
- Australian International Academic Conference on Motherhood (1st : 2001 : University of Queensland); Porter, Marie, 1938-; O'Reilly, Andrea, 1961-; Short, Patricia, 1950- (2005), Motherhood : power and oppression, Women's Press, ISBN 978-0-88961-454-3

== See also ==
- Andrea O'Reilly
- MIRCI
