= Lydia Perović =

Lydia Perović is a Montenegrin Canadian writer and author. She has written for n+1, The Believer, Opera Canada, the Toronto Star, the Los Angeles Review of Books, the Globe and Mail, The Wholenote, Daily Xtra, Literary Mothers, and Bookforum.

Her first novel, Incidental Music, was a finalist for a 2013 Lambda Literary Award.

Her second novel All That Sang, won Best Book at the 2016 Expozine Alternative Press Awards Gala.

Perović grew up in Yugoslavia and moved to Nova Scotia in 1999. She has lived in Toronto since 2005.

She received a MA in political science from Dalhousie University in 2001.

== Books ==
- Lost in Canada: An Immigrant's Second Thoughts (Sutherland House, 2022)
- All That Sang (Esplanade Books, 2016)
- Incidental Music (Inanna Publications, 2012)
