= Andrea O'Reilly =

Canadian writer (born 1961)

Andrea O'Reilly (born 1961) is the founder of Motherhood Studies and currently a professor in the School of Women's Studies at York University in Toronto, Ontario, Canada.

== Career ==
O'Reilly founded the Association for Research on Mothering (ARM) at York University in 1998 and ran it until it closed in 2010. Its disbandment led to the inception of a new organization, the Motherhood Initiative for Research and Community Involvement. She is founder and editor-in-chief of the Journal of the Association for Research on Mothering, now the Journal of the Motherhood Initiative for Research and Community Involvement. In 2006, as director of ARM, she founded Demeter Press, the first feminist press on motherhood. As well, she is founder of the feminist mothers group "Mother Outlaws".

She is also the author or editor of eighteen books on motherhood.

== Selected works ==
=== As author ===
- — (2004). Toni Morrison and Motherhood: A Politics of the Heart. State University of New York Press. ISBN 978-0-7914-6075-7.
- — (2006). Rocking the Cradle: Thoughts on Feminism, Motherhood and the Possibility of Empowered Mothering. Demeter Press. ISBN 1-55014-449-9.

=== As editor ===
- Abbey, Sharon; —, eds. (1998). Redefining Motherhood: Changing Identities and Patterns. Second Story Press. ISBN 978-1-896764-06-1.
- —, ed. (2004). Mother Matters: Motherhood as Discourse and Practice; Essays from the Journal of the Association for Research on Mothering. Toronto: Association for Research on Mothering. ISBN 978-1-55014-436-9. OCLC 54501026.
- —, ed. (2004). From Motherhood to Mothering: The Legacy of Adrienne Rich's Of Woman Born. State University of New York Press. ISBN 978-0-7914-6288-1.
- —; Porter, Marie; Short, Patricia, eds. (25 August 2005). Motherhood: Power and Oppression. Canadian Scholars' Press. ISBN 978-0-88961-454-3.
- —, ed. (2010). Encyclopedia of Motherhood. Sage. doi:10.4135/9781412979276.
- —, ed. (2014). Mothers, Mothering and Motherhood Across Cultural Differences: A Reader. Chicago: Demeter Press. ISBN 978-1-927335-75-8.

== Personal life ==
O’Reilly has two grown daughters.
