= Aemilia Laracuen =

Aemilia Laraçuen (married name Emilia MacKinley; 1925–2007) was an American artist and muse of poet Robert Graves. She was also known variously as Cindy Lee and Emile Laraçuen.

Aemilia Laracuen inspired many of Graves's love poems and was also the illustrator of one of his best-known poetry collections, Love Respelt.

Graves was Oxford's professor of poetry between 1961 and 1966, He met and became involved with the American Mexican when she was thirty and he was in his mid-sixties. After meeting in New York, Graves persuaded her to come to live near him in Deià on Mallorca. His wife seemingly tolerated this affair. The 37-year age gap between Aemilia and Graves did not bother her, she said. "Robert was great-looking and in good shape. He had a brilliant mind, was very funny and charming."

Graves became so besotted with Aemilia that he bought her a house in Puerto Vallarta, Mexico. And yet she took a lover, the beat poet Howard Hart, to live there. Their letters are documented and stored at the University of Victoria. Under an agreement with the Graves family, they were not to be read until his widow Beryl had died. Beryl died in late 2003.

Aemelia married for the third time and for the last years of her life, after her third divorce, retained her married name Emilia MacKinley. She lived her later years travelling between Puerto Vallarta and New York City.
