= Tracey Porter =

American children's book author

- Occupations: Author and educator
- Writing career
- Genre: Children's books

Tracey Porter is an American children's book author. She writes novels targeted towards children aged 9 to 12. Her novel Billy Creekmore was named in Oprah.com's Kids' Reading List, compiled by the American Library Association. She is a middle-school teacher at Crossroads School in Santa Monica, California.

== Books ==
- Treasures in the Dust. HarperCollins. 1997. ISBN 0-613-18284-7.
- A Dance of Sisters. Joanna Cotler. 2002. ISBN 0-06-028182-0.
- Billy Creekmore. HarperCollins. 2007. ISBN 978-0-06-077570-4.
- Lark. HarperCollins. 2011. ISBN 978-0061122873.
