= Serbian Chancellery in Dubrovnik =

Historical Serbian diplomatic office in Dubrovnik

The Serbian Chancellery (Serbian: Српска канцеларија), sometimes known as the Slavic Chancellery (словенска канцеларија), was a diplomatic and economical office of several states of Serbia in the Middle Ages (such as Kingdom of Serbia, Kingdom of Bosnia, Serbian Empire and Serbian Despotate) in the Republic of Ragusa (now in Dubrovnik, Croatia). It was established in the early 13th century.

It served for Cyrillic transcription by Romanophones in the city in correspondence with Serbian lands in the interior; with the Serbian Orthodox and members of the Bosnian Church. The initial chancellors were Romans (Italics), or Slavophones, or Slavicized Romans who hailed from local patrician noble families. Only in the 14th century, there were scribes belonging to the lower classes, whose biographies are harder to determine.

The head scribe (канцелар) of the chancellery was titled dijak srpski ("Serb scribe"). Three early names of chancellery scribes are known from between 1278 and 1336: Ozren, Stojan Ceprić (1312–19, a nobleman), and Stefan Benčulić. During the rule of King and Emperor Stefan Dušan (r. 1331–55), Jaketa Krusić was a chancellery scribe (ca. 1340–47), followed by Dživo Parmesan (1348–63) and Niko Bijelić (1363–1367). The next known chancellery scribes were Maroje Niklić (1379–87), Vidoš Bogdanić (1388–89, from Korčula), Rusko Hristoforović (1392–1431, an important figure), Nikša Zvijezdić (1431–1455, sometimes known as Nikola) and Marinko Cvijetković (1455–74). Paskoje Primojević was the Serbian scribe in the 1482–1527 period, while his son Trajan Primojević was recorded in 1531.
