= Paskoje Primojević =

Ragusan poet and Serbian scribe in Ragusa

- Other names: Pasqualis de Primo
- Occupation: scribe
- Years active: 1482—1527
- Known for: Chief of chancellery of the Ragusan government (Italian: Consilium Rogatorum)

Paskoje Primojević (Serbian: Паскоје Примојевић; Italian: Pasqualis de Primo), or Pasko, was Ragusan poet and Serbian scribe in Ragusa in the 1482–1527 period.

== Life and works ==
Primojević was born into the Ragusan noble family Primojević (Italian: Primo). The family hailed from the region of Sutjeska, and belonged to a group of notable Ragusan families that migrated from the territory of Bosnia and Herzegovina. There were two branches of the family in Dubrovnik, both hailing from Bosnia and Herzegovina, from where their ancestors moved to Dubrovnik in the 14th century, and both became notable. Paskoje belongs to the branch which produced three chancellors in the Ragusan government, and one notable poet. The other branch was involved in trade. Their coat of arms with a sun and three stars can be found in the Church of the Holy Mother of Mercy and in front of the house of M. Jakšić.

Paskoje's father was Pripčo Dobreljević (1400–1466). Paskoje had sons Trajan, Niko and Luka, all of whom became scribes. Trajan and Niko were both Serbian scribes, in the period of 1527–36 and 1536–66, respectively. Luka (fl. 1504–24) was a Latin script scribe. Paskoje and his sons wrote their texts in the Jekavian pronunciation of Shtokavian.

== Attempt to establish printing house ==
Members of the Primojević family were actively working on establishing a printing house in Ragusa. In his letter of 8 March 1514, Luka Primojević requested approval from the Ragusan government (Italian: Consilium Rogatorum) to import a printing machine to Ragusa and to open a printing house, to print books in Latin, Greek and Cyrillic script, the latter based on the script used at the Crnojević printing house. Primojević requested a guarantee from the Ragusan government to not allow other printing houses to be opened in Ragusa for the next 15 years. The Ragusan government accepted this under the condition that the printing house would be finished in one year. One year later Luka requested for extension of this period for another eight months, which was also accepted. Still, for some reason, he failed to establish printing press.

== Chief of Chancellery ==
Paskoje, then chancellor of Ragusa, was sent by the Ragusan government to Ottoman-held Herceg Novi to negotiate with Novi's dizdar on 18 August 1499.

In a 1502 document of the Ragusan Senate, Paskoje was referred to as the chief of chancellery of the Government of the Republic of Ragusa.

In 1517 Paskoje went to the court because of a lawsuit of some trader from Adrianople.

== Sources ==
- Đorđić, Petar (1987). Istorija srpske ćirilice. Zavod za udžbenike i nastavna sredstva. ISBN 9788617003386.
- Ernst, Gerhard (2003). Histoire linguistique de la Romania: manuel international d'histoire linguistique de la Romania. Walter de Gruyter. ISBN 978-3-11-014694-3.
- Bogišić, Rafo (1987). Mladi dani Marina Držića. Mladost. ISBN 9788605001622.
- Popović, Toma (1973). Turska i Dubrovnik u XVI veku. Srpska književna zadruga.
