= Medo Pucić =

Ragusan writer

- Born: 21 March 1821; Dubrovnik, Kingdom of Dalmatia, Austrian Empire
- Died: 30 June 1882 (aged 61); Dubrovnik, Kingdom of Dalmatia, Austria-Hungary
- Occupations: writer, poet

Orsat "Medo" Pucić, (Italian: Orsatto Pozza, Serbian Cyrillic: Орсат "Медо" Пуцић; 12 March 1821 – 30 June 1882) was a Ragusan writer and an important member of the Serb-Catholic movement in Dubrovnik.

== Biography ==
Orsat Pucić was born on 21 March 1821 in Dubrovnik, then in the Austrian Empire. He was descended from the House of Pucić, an old noble family of Republic of Ragusa. His brother was Niko Pucić. He attended the lyceum in Venice, where in 1841 he became acquainted with Ján Kollár, as well as Adam Mickiewicz, and started to espouse a Serb national sentiment. Pucić was impressed with pan-Slavist ideas, and went on to join the Illyrian movement. Pucić was a member of the Serb Catholic movement.

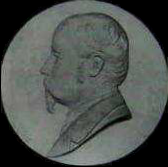
Medo Pucić

He studied between 1841 and 1843 in the University of Padua, and then from 1843 to 1845 he studied law in Vienna and was a Knight Hospitaller of the Sovereign Order of Saint John. In 1843, desiring to get in touch with his Slavic roots, he renamed himself "Medo" from his original baptized name of Orsat.

Pucić lived in the cities of Lucca and Parma between 1846 and 1849, serving in the Habsburg courts. Pucić was in active contact with cultural and political circles of Central Croatia, the rest of the Austrian Empire, and different countries of Europe. In March 1848 Pucić threw his lot with Adam Mickiewicz who was in Rome at the time trying to convince Pope Pius IX to endorse a Polish national revolution against the Habsburgs. In 1858 Medo Pucić published the first volume Serbian Documents (Spomenici Srpski) in Belgrade which consisted of documents written by Rusko Hristoforović (1395-1423) of the Serbian Chancellery in Dubrovnik.

After 1860 when the political life in the Austro-Hungarian Monarchy was revived, he took part in the Serbian and Croatian national movements in Dalmatia and the politics in Croatia proper. Pucić's pan-Slavic (or pan-South-Slavic) idea was based on the principle of unification of Croats with the Slavic tradition in Dubrovnik. Pucić was a vocal supporter of the unification of all the South-Slavic lands within the Habsburg monarchy around one nation, called later Yugoslavia.

Medo Pucić was the first person to publicly call himself a Serb, while at the same time believing that the Croatian name for the language he spoke was merely a synonym of the Serbian name, so he was effectively an adherent of slovinstvo, a pan-Slavic view of South Slavic nationalities.

In 1868, he moved to Belgrade to become a teacher to the young prince Milan Obrenović IV until he came of age in 1872. He returned to Dubrovnik in 1874, and played an important role in the cultural life of the city in the 1870s. The Serb party had among its supporters in Dubrovnik, alongside Serbs (Orthodox), and some Catholics, who have since declared themselves Serbs of the Catholic faith, the Serb-Catholic movement in Dubrovnik. The appearance of Dubrovnik Serb Catholics was based on Vuk Karadžić's assumption that all those who spoke Štokavian were Serbs.

In 1878, Pucić was one of the founders of a new literary magazine Slovinac, joined by Luko Zore, Jovan Sundečić, Vuk Vrčević, and a number of other Serb and Croat intellectuals who contributed to it until Pucić's death in 1882 and afterwards.

== Literary works ==
Pucić wrote lyrical and epic poems, patriotic lyric poetry, political essays and historical studies. The preferred motive of his work was the history of Dubrovnik and the Republic of Ragusa. He also translated literary works from several European languages into his own Dubrovnik dialect of Serbo-Croatian, which he called Serbian. He translated various Croatian and Serbian works into Italian, which is when he used the name Orsatto Pozza.

He translated many poems and works of Adam Mickiewicz and it is said the two were close acquaintances. Pucić expressed his ideas of Slavdom in his first poems, Slavjanstvo Bosanske dvorije in 1841 and another in 1842 dedicated to Ján Kollár.

Pucić started writing poetry in 1840. He was initially writing romantic lyrics, but later moved towards a more national epic style. Some of his more important works include:

- Slovjanska antologija iz rukopisah dubrovačkih pjesnikah (Slavic Anthology from the Manuscripts of Dubrovnik Poets), 1844
- Talijanke (The Italian Ones), 1848 (elegies)
- Spomenici srpski od godine 1395. do 1423. (Serbian monuments from Year 1395 to 1423), book I, Belgrade 1858 and book II, Belgrade 1862
- Dei canti popolari illirici, discorso detto Adam Mickiewicz, Zara 1860
- Giovanni Gundulich. vita (Ivan Gundulić), from Favilla journal, Trieste, 1843, №XIX, p. 293-301
- Pjesme (Poems), 1862 and 1879
- Karađurđevka, 1864
- Kasnachich G. (Giovanni) Augusto e O.P (Orsato Pozza) sugli slavi from giornale Dalmazia 1847 n. p. 43
- Le nozze di Platone, o dialogo dell amore, tradotto nell´occasione delle nozze di sua sorella Anna (con Marino Giorgi) dal Conte Orsato Pozza, Trieste 1857
- Compendio della storia di Ragusa dall´originale italiano di G. Resti per cura di O. Pozza, Zara 1856

== See also ==
- House of Pucić
- Niko Pucić

== Sources ==
- Banac, Ivo (1983). "The Confessional "Rule" and the Dubrovnik Exception: The Origins of the "Serb-Catholic" Circle in Nineteenth-Century Dalmatia". Slavic Review. Vol. 42, no. 3. pp. 448–474. JSTOR 2496046.
- Mladineo, Goran (2012). "Nikola TOLJA, Dubrovački Srbi katolici – istine i zablude, vlastita naklada, Dubrovnik, 2011., 711 str". Journal of Contemporary History (in Croatian). 44 (3). Croatian Institute of History: 800–803. ISSN 0590-9597.
- Reill, Dominique Kirchner (2012). Nationalists Who Feared the Nation: Adriatic Multi-Nationalism in Habsburg Dalmatia, Trieste, and Venice. Stanford University Press. ISBN 9780804778497.
