= Marko Car (writer) =

Serbian writer (1859–1953)

Marko Car Марко Цар
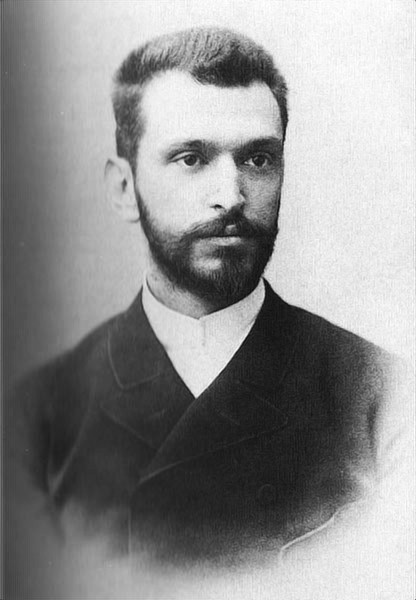
- Photography from ca. 1885.
- Born: 30 August 1859; Herceg-Novi, Kingdom of Dalmatia
- Died: 1 December 1953 (aged 94); Belgrade, Socialist Federal Republic of Yugoslavia
- Occupations: writer and politician

Marko Car (Serbian Cyrillic: Марко Цар; 30 August 1859 – 1 December 1953) was a Serbian writer, politician and activist from the Bay of Kotor. He was a polyglot and an aesthetic essayist, writing numerous poems, novels, narratives, essays, and travel reports. During his lifetime, he wrote for many newspapers and magazines.

== Biography ==
Marko Car was born in 1859 in the town of Herceg-Novi in the Bay of Kotor, then a part of the Kingdom of Dalmatia province of the Austrian Empire. He received his basic education in the local Italian popular school, after which he moved to Kotor and finished the classical gymnasium.

Then he moved to the province's capital of Zadar in 1879, entering political life by joining the Serb People's Party (Dalmatia) of Sava Bjelanović (whose biography he later wrote and published in Dubrovnik's Serb Press in 1911) which fought for the defense of national interests of the Serb people in the wake of the Croatian nationalistic movement. He worked in the Dalmatian Diet from 1884 to 1918. His friends and colleagues were Luko Zore, Antun Fabris, Pero Budmani, Medo Pucić, Niko Pucić, Ivan Stojanović, and other members of the Serb-Catholic circle. He was the editor of the Zadar magazine called Vuk (The Wolf), one of the most influential periodicals, that was being published in 1884. Though short-lived, Vuk provoked and stimulated numerous debates among Croatian, Italian and Serbian intellectuals in Dalmatia on the literary, artistic and social life of the time.

He became famous as a writer for his work in 1883 entitled Za kišljive dnevi (During the Rainy Days).

He worked for the Matica srpska in Dubrovnik in 1910, the year he published "Naše Primorije," printed by the Serbian Dubrovnik Printing Press.

When the Kingdom of Serbs, Croats and Slovenes was created, Car moved to the new monarchy's capital of Belgrade in 1919, where he spent the interwar period. He worked for the Yugoslavian Ministry of Education as the Inspector of the Artist division until retirement in 1921. Car is the founder of the Society of Serbian Writers in Belgrade, being its first President. He then received his membership in the Serbian Royal Academy, later known as the Serbian Academy of Sciences and Arts, and also membership in the Matica srpska in Novi Sad. He was also for one time a President of the Serbian Literary Guild (1937-1941).

After the April war and the Nazi occupation of the Kingdom of Yugoslavia in 1941, he fled to Italy across Zadar. After the war ended and the Communist Partisans won in 1945, he returned to Belgrade where he spent the rest of his life.

He died on 1 December 1953 in Belgrade, FR Yugoslavia. His remains were moved to Montenegro to the countryside of his birth and he was buried in the Savina Monastery, according to his own wishes.

He was a polyglot, translating from Italian and French into Serbo-Croatian.

== Religious and national beliefs ==
Although born a Roman Catholic Christian, he converted before death to Eastern Orthodoxy, claiming that that was the only way to save the Catholic-Serb community from extinction and avoid assimilation into Croats, which he had claimed was occurring in the Bocca. His movement didn't have significant impact outside his native Dalmatian coastland, but in there a significant number of Catholics converted to Orthodox Christians considering it a confirmation of their Serbian national identity and affiliation.

== Legacy ==
A street in Herceg Novi's Old City bears his name in his honor. In it is also a bust raised in his honor by sculptor Petar Palavicini (also spelled Palaviccini) not long after Car's death.

== Works ==
- Venecija
- U Latinima
- Moje simpatije
- Od Jadrana do Balkana
- Niz rodno primorje
- S bojnog i ljubabnog polja
- Sava Bjelanović
- Estetička pisma
- Ogledala i predavanja
- Eseji
- Jedan zaboravljeni pesnik mora
- Dubrovnik i okolina
- Savremene Italijanske pripovetke
- Naše primorije
