= List of romantics =

List of romantics

== Brazilian Romanticism ==
- Joaquim Manuel de Macedo (novelist)
- José de Alencar (novelist)
- Castro Alves (poet)
- Gonçalves Dias (poet)
- Fagundes Varela (poet)
- Casimiro de Abreu (poet)
- Álvares de Azevedo (poet, short-story writer)
- Bernardo Guimarães (novelist)
- Manuel Antônio de Almeida (novelist)
- Visconde de Taunay (painting)

== Czech Romanticism ==
- Karel Hynek Mácha (poetry)
- Bedřich Smetana (music)
- Ján Kollár (fairy tales)
- Antonín Dvořák (music)

== Dutch Romanticism ==
- Hildebrand / Nicolaas Beets (theologian, writer and poet)
- Willem Bilderdijk (poet)
- Jacob Geel (scholar, writer and critic)
- Multatuli / Eduard Douwes Dekker (writer)
- Mata Hari (courtesan)

== English Romanticism ==
- Samuel Palmer (visual artist)
- William Blake (painting, engraving, poetry)
- George Gordon Byron, 6th Baron Byron (poetry)
- John Clare (poetry)
- Samuel Taylor Coleridge (poetry, philosophy, criticism, German scholar)
- John Constable (painting)
- Thomas de Quincey (essays, criticism, biography)
- Thomas Chatterton (poetry)
- Ebenezer Elliot (Poet Activist)
- William Hazlitt (criticism, essays)
- John Keats (poetry)
- Charles Lamb (poetry, essays)
- Mary Shelley (novels)
- Percy Bysshe Shelley (poetry)
- Robert Southey (poetry, biography)
- J. M. W. Turner (painting)
- William Wordsworth (poetry)
- Dorothy Wordsworth (diaries)
- John William Waterhouse (painting, also a Pre-Raphaelite)

== Estonian Romanticism ==
- Theodor Altermann (dramatist)
- Eduard Bornhöhe (writer)
- Villem Kapp (composer)
- Lydia Koidula (poet)
- Friedrich Reinhold Kreutzwald (writer)
- Johann Köler (painter)
- Ants Lauter (dramatist)
- Artur Lemba (composer)
- Mihkel Lüdig (composer)
- Liina Reiman (dramatist)

== French Romanticism ==
- Alexandre Dumas, père (writer)
- Charles-Valentin Alkan (composer)
- Honoré de Balzac (novelist)
- Antoine-Louis Barye (sculptor)
- Hector Berlioz (composer)
- Georges Bizet (composer)
- Théodore Chassériau (painter)
- François-René de Chateaubriand (writer)
- Eugène Delacroix (painter)
- Théophile Gautier (poet)
- Théodore Géricault (painter)
- Victor Hugo (poet, novelist, dramatist)
- Alphonse de Lamartine (poet)
- Alfred de Musset (poet)
- Charles Nodier, (writer), leader of the Romanticist movement
- Hubert Robert, (painter)
- Jean-Jacques Rousseau (philosophic grounds)
- George Sand (novelist)
- Stendhal (novelist)
- Eugène Emmanuel Viollet-le-Duc (architect)
- Alfred de Vigny (poet)

== German Romanticism ==
- Caspar David Friedrich (painter)
- Johannes Brahms (composer)
- Joseph Görres (writer, essayist)
- Jakob Grimm (story collector, linguist)
- Wilhelm Grimm (story collector, linguist)
- Carl Gustav Carus (painter)
- Karl Friedrich Lessing (painter)
- Philipp Otto Runge (painter)
- Adam Müller (literary critic and political theorist)
- Novalis (poet, novelist)
- Joseph von Eichendorff (poet, writer)
- Friedrich Schlegel (poet, theorist)
- August Wilhelm Schlegel (poet, translator, theorist)
- Franz Schubert (composer)
- Robert Schumann (composer, polemicist)
- Ludwig Tieck (novelist, translator)
- Ludwig Uhland (poet, dramatist)
- E.T.A. Hoffmann (writer, composer)
- Georg Wilhelm Friedrich Hegel (philosopher)
- Adolf von Henselt (composer)
- Zacharias Werner (poet, dramatist)
- Ludwig van Beethoven (composer)
- Johann Wolfgang von Goethe (novelist, poet, scientist)
- Richard Wagner (composer)
- Friedrich Hölderlin (poet)
- Heinrich Heine (poet)
- Friedrich Wilhelm Joseph Schelling (philosopher)
- Johann Gottlieb Fichte (writer, theorist)
- Adrian Ludwig Richter (painter)
- Carl Spitzweg (painter)
- Eberhard Wächter (painter)
- Gerhard von Kügelgen (painter)
- Members of the Nazarene movement (visual artists)
- Carl Maria von Weber (composer)
- Felix Mendelssohn (composer)
- Franz Liszt (composer)
- Heinrich von Kleist (poet, dramatist, novelist)
- Friedrich Schleiermacher (theologian, philosopher)
- Wilhelm Heinrich Wackenroder (writer)

== Irish Romanticism ==
- Thomas Davis (poet, political theorist)
- John Field (composer)
- James Clarence Mangan (poet)
- Thomas Moore (poet)
- Padraic Pearse (poet, journalist, revolutionary)
- Oscar Wilde (poet and author)

== Hungarian Romanticism ==
- Sándor Petőfi (poet)
- Mihály Vörösmarty (poet)
- Mór Jókai (writer)
- Imre Madách (dramatist)
- Franz Liszt (composer)

== Italian Romanticism ==
- Aleardo Aleardi (poet)
- Giuseppe Gioacchino Belli (poet)
- Giovanni Berchet (poet)
- Ugo Foscolo (poet, novelist, political theorist)
- Francesco Hayez (painter)
- Giacomo Leopardi (poet, philosopher)
- Alessandro Manzoni (novelist)
- Giuseppe Mazzini (political theorist)
- Giuseppe Parini (poet, satirist)
- Ippolito Pindemonte (poet)
- Carlo Porta (poet)
- Giovanni Prati (poet, political theorist)

== North American Romanticism ==
- Albert Bierstadt (painter, German-born)
- George Catlin (painter)
- William Cullen Bryant (poet)
- Wilfred Campbell (poet, Canadian)
- James Fenimore Cooper (novelist)
- Emily Dickinson (poet)
- Ralph Waldo Emerson (poet, essayist)
- Louis Moreau Gottschalk (composer)
- Nathaniel Hawthorne (novelist)
- Washington Irving (novelist, satirist)
- Archibald Lampman (poet)
- Henry Wadsworth Longfellow (poet)
- James Russell Lowell (writer)
- Edward MacDowell (composer)
- Herman Melville (novelist)
- Edgar Allan Poe (poet, short story writer)
- Charles Sangster (poet, Canadian)
- Henry David Thoreau (poet, essayist)
- John Greenleaf Whittier (poet)

== Norwegian Romanticism ==
- Henrik Wergeland (poet)
- Edvard Grieg (composer)
- Johann Sebastian Welhaven (poet)
- Adolph Tidemand (painter)
- Hans Gude (painter)
- Johan Christian Dahl (painter)

== Polish Romanticism ==
Romanticism in Poland was followed, after the disastrous January 1863 Uprising, by a period known as Positivism.

- Frédéric Chopin (composer)
- Adam Jerzy Czartoryski (writer)
- Felicjan Faleński (poet)
- Aleksander Fredro (comedy writer)
- Cyprian Godebski (poet)
- Seweryn Goszczyński (poet)
- Józef Korzeniowski (writer)
- Zygmunt Krasiński (poet)
- Józef Ignacy Kraszewski (writer)
- Joachim Lelewel (philosopher)
- Antoni Malczewski (poet)
- Piotr Michałowski (painter)
- Adam Mickiewicz (poet)
- Stanisław Moniuszko (composer)
- Cyprian Kamil Norwid (poet)
- Wincenty Pol (poet)
- Juliusz Słowacki (poet)
- Andrzej Towiański (philosopher)
- Kornel Ujejski (poet)
- Henryk Wieniawski (composer)

== Portuguese Romanticism ==
- Almeida Garrett (writer, poet, dramatist, journalist)
- Alexandre Herculano (writer, novelist, poet, journalist, historian)
- Camilo Castelo Branco (writer, novelist)
- João de Deus (writer, poet)
- António Feliciano de Castilho (writer, poet, translator)
- João de Lemos (writer, poet)
- José Vianna da Motta (composer and pianist)

== Romanian Romanticism ==
- Vasile Alecsandri (poet, playwright)
- Gheorghe Asachi (poet, short story writer, playwright)
- Dimitrie Bolintineanu (poet)
- Cezar Bolliac (poet)
- George Coşbuc (poet)
- Dora d'Istria (essayist, travel writer)
- Mihai Eminescu (a Romantic for part of his career; poet, short story writer, essayist)
- Nicolae Filimon (novelist and short story writer)
- Ion Ghica (essayist and memoirist)
- Andrei Mureşanu (poet)
- Costache Negruzzi (short story writer)
- Alexandru Odobescu (short story writer)
- Bogdan Petriceicu-Hasdeu (historian and playwright)
- Ion Heliade Rădulescu (poet, essayist)
- Iosif Vulcan (dramatist, short story writer, essayist, novelist)

== Russian Romanticism ==
- Ivan Aivazovsky (painter)
- Mily Balakirev (composer)
- Alexander Borodin (composer)
- Karl Briullov (painter)
- César Cui (composer)
- Mikhail Glinka (composer)
- Mikhail Lermontov (poet, novelist)
- Modest Mussorgsky (composer)
- Aleksandr Pushkin (poet and novelist)
- Nikolai Rimsky-Korsakov (composer)
- Pyotr Ilyich Tchaikovsky (composer)
- Vasily Zhukovsky (poet)
- Konstantin Batyushkov (poet)
- Orest Kiprensky (painter)
- Vasily Tropinin (painter)
- Sergei Lyapunov (composer)
- Nikolai Medtner (composer)
- Sergei Bortkiewicz (composer)
- Anton Arensky (composer)
- Georgy Catoire (composer)
- Sergei Rachmaninoff (composer)
- Vasili Pukirev (painter)

== Serbian Romanticism ==
- Branko Radičević (poet)
- Đura Jakšić (poet, playwright, painter)
- Jovan Jovanović Zmaj (poet)
- Laza Kostić (poet, playwright)
- Petar II Petrović-Njegoš (poet)
- Kosta Trifković (playwright/poet)
- Bogoboj Atanacković (novelist)
- Vuk Stefanović Karadžić (philologist)
- Avram Miletić (poet)
- Old Rashko (epic poet/guslar)
- Živana Antonijević (epic poet/guslar)
- Tešan Podrugović (epic poet/guslar)
- Filip Višnjić (epic poet/guslar)
- Sava Mrkalj (poet/philologist)
- Đuro Daničić (philologist)
- Vuk Vrčević (collaborated with Vuk Karadžić)
- Ivan Stojanović (poet)
- Jovan Sundečić (poet)
- Katarina Ivanovic (artist)
- Novak Radonić (poet)
- Đorđe Marković Koder (writer)
- Milica Stojadinović Srpkinja (poet)
- Staka Skenderova (writer)
- Vaso Pelagić (writer)
- Stjepan Mitrov Ljubiša (poet)
- Pavle Stamatović (writer)
- Visarion Ljubiša (writer)
- Čedomilj Mijatović (novelist)
- Ilarion Ruvarac (writer)
- Mato Vodopić (Serb-Catholic Bishop of Dubrovnik and poet)
- Novak Radonić (artist)
- Marko Miljanov (writer)
- Nikša Gradi (writer)
- Pero Budmani (writer)
- Ivan Stojanović (writer)
- Mirko Petrović-Njegoš (poet)
- Sima Milutinović Sarajlija (poet)
- Steva Todorović (artist)
- Pavle Simić (artist)

== Slovene Romanticism ==
- France Prešeren (poet, considered one of the greatest of his time)
- Janez Vesel (poet)
- Matija Čop (historian and critic)
- Urban Jarnik (priest, poet, ethnographer and linguist)
- Anton Martin Slomšek (bishop, author and poet)
- Stanko Vraz (poet)
- Etbin Costa (author and politician)
- Hugo Wolf (composer)
- Janez Bleiweis (politician and journalist)
- Lovro Toman (nationalist and activist)
- Josipina Turnograjska (poet, composer and writer)
- Jernej Kopitar (philologist and linguist)
- Anton Karinger (painter, poet and soldier)

== Scottish Romanticism ==
- Robert Burns (poet, considered a forerunner of British Romanticism along with Thomas Gray)
- Thomas Carlyle (essayist, historian and philosopher)
- James Macpherson (poet)
- Walter Scott (poet and historical novelist)
- George MacDonald (author and poet)
- John Duncan (painter)

== Spanish Romanticism ==
Spanish Romanticism emerged in the years following the Napoleonic Wars, and reached its apex in the 1840s. Much of Spanish Romanticism serves as criticism of contemporary Spanish society, as seen directly in the Articulos de Costumbre (essays on customs/daily life) by Larra. Important literary works in Spanish Romanticism include Larra's essays (each article published separately until 1836), Don Juan Tenorio by Zorrilla (1844), El Estudiante de Salamanca (1840) and Poesias (1840) by Espronceda, and Rimas y Leyendas by Becquer (1871).

- Mariano Jose de Larra (essayist)
- José de Espronceda (poet, tale writer)
- Jose Zorrilla (playwright, poet)
- Gustavo Adolfo Becquer (poet, tale writer)
- Francisco Goya (painter)
- Antonio María Esquivel (painter)
- Eugenio Lucas Velázquez (painter)
- Federico de Madrazo (painter)

== Welsh Romanticism ==
- Iolo Morganwg
- Felicia Hemans

== Other countries ==
- Adam Gottlob Oehlenschläger (Danish poet, playwright)
- Uładzimir Karatkievič (Belarusian writer)
- Jónas Hallgrímsson (Icelandic poet, political activist)
- Raden Saleh (Indonesian painter)
- Taras Shevchenko (Ukrainian poet)
- Esaias Tegnér (Swedish writer)
- Egide Charles Gustave Wappers (Belgian painter)
- Anne Louise Germaine de Staël (Swiss writer)
- Miguel Barnet (Cuban writer, novelist and ethnographer)

== See also ==
- Romanticism
- Romantic poetry
- Romantic nationalism

== External links and references ==
- The Romantic Poets
