= Matija Ban =

Serbo-Croatian poet, dramatist and playwright

- Матија Бан
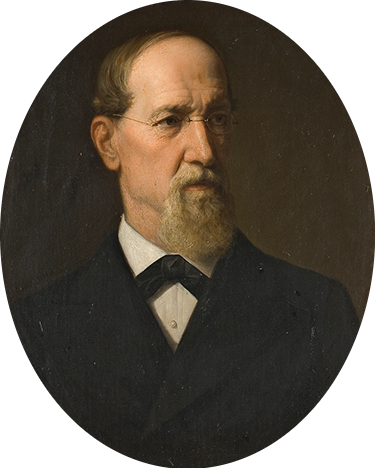
- Born: 16 December 1818; Dubrovnik, Austrian Empire (now Croatia)
- Died: 14 March 1903 (aged 84); Belgrade, Kingdom of Serbia (now Serbia)
- Occupations: writer, diplomat
- Writing career
- Notable works: Cvijeti Srbske (1865); Vanja (1868)

Matija Ban (Serbian Cyrillic: Матија Бан; 6 December 1818 – 14 March 1903) was a Serbian writer and academic. He is known as one of the earliest proponents of the Serb-Catholic movement in Dubrovnik.

== Biography ==
Ban was born in Petrovo Selo near Dubrovnik, then in the Kingdom of Dalmatia in the Austrian Empire, now in Croatia.

After working as a language teacher in Greek schools in Constantinople and Bursa, Matija Ban settled in Serbia in 1844. He is commonly regarded as being the first to use the term "Yugoslav", in a poem in 1835. In 1848 he came from Serbia to Dalmatia to study the state of national sentiment there. He returned to Belgrade in 1850 to teach at the Lyceum of the Principality of Serbia.

His best known literary works include 14 dramas and tragedies related to Slavic history (Miljenko i Dobrila, 1850; Mejrima ili Bošnjaci, 1851; Car Lazar, 1858; Marta Posadnica, 1871; 1880; Jan Hus, 1884, etc.).

Matija Ban was a member of the Society of Serbian Letters (1858), Serbian Learned Society (1864), and Serbian Royal Academy (1892).

== Works ==
- Ban, Matija: Vospitatelь ženskій piše Matія Banъ Prva svezka (Beograd: Knьigopečatnя Knяžestva Srbskogъ, 1847)
- Ban, Matija: Pravila o četničkoй voйni. Protolmačіo izъ polьskoga sa nekimъ promenama, izmetcima i dodatcima Matія Banъ. (Beograd: Knьigopečatnя Knяžestva Srbskogъ, 1848)
- Ban, Matija: Osnovi rata. Sastavio po načelama naйiskusnіi voйvoda Matія Banъ. (Beograd: Knьigopečatnя Knяžestva Srbskogъ, 1848)
- Ban, Matija: Meйrima ili Bošnяaci: Pozorišno dѣlo u petъ razdѣla. Spisao Matія Banъ Dubrovčaninъ (Novi Sad: Nar. Knъigopečatnя Dr. Danila Medakovića, 1851)
- Ban, Matija: Dubrovnik cviet narodnoga književstva: Svezak drugi za godinu MDCCCLI (Zagreb: Tiskarnica Dra. Ljudevita Gaja, 1851)
- Ban, Matija: Cvieti srbske: Drama u petъ razdѣla. Napisao Matія Banъ za pedeseto-godišnю svetkovinu oslobođenя Srbiє (Beograd: Knьigopečatnя Aleksandra Andrića, 1866)
- Ban, Matija: Car Lazar ili Propast na Kosovu: Tragedija u 5 razdjela, Dubrovnik: Zabavnik Narodne štionice dubrovačke za godinu 1867 (Split: Brzotiskom Antuna Zannoni, (1866). str. 25–144)
- Ban, Matija: Smrt posljednjega Nemanjića: Tragedija u 5 razdiela, Dragoljub: Zabavni i poučni list Broj 19 (Zagreb: Gjuro Dreželić, (1867). str. 289–296)
- Ban, Matija: Uroš V i mati mu Jelena: Tragedija u pet razdjela, Dubrovnik: Zabavnik Narodne štionice dubrovačke za godinu 1868 (Split: Brzotiskom Antuna Zannoni, (1868). str. 3-55)
- Ban, Matija: Vanda kraljica poljska: Tragedija M. Bana u 5 činova (Dubrovnik: Naklada tiskarnice Dragutina Pretnera, 1882, Slovinac Broj 7. str. 98–105)
- Ban, Matija: Zanosi, 1883, (Slovinac Broj 4. str. 61–62)
- Ban, Matija: Jan Hus: Tragedija u 5 činova (Dubrovnik: Naklada tiskarnice Dragutina Pretnera, 1884, Slovinac Broj 3 – pp. 34–42, Broj 4 – pp. 50–57, Broj 5 – pp. 65–74, Broj 6 – pp. 83–90, Broj 7 – pp. 97–105)
- Ban, Matija: Solution de la Question d'Orient: par l'Europe ou par La Porte? (Beograd: Imprimerie d'État, 1885)
- Ban, Matija: Knez Nikola Zrinjski: Junačka drama u pet činova (Zagreb: Matica hrvatska, 1888)
- Ban, Matija: Moralne i politične iskrice iz slovenske istorije (Beograd: Kraljevsko-srpska državna štamparija, 1888)
- Ban, Matija: O Ivanu Gunduliću (Beograd: Kraljevsko-srpska državna štamparija, 1888)
- Ban, Matija: Marta Posadnica ili Pad Velikog Novgoroda (Beograd: Kraljevsko-srpska državna štamparija, 1889)
- Ban, Matija: Život majora Miše Atanasijevića, Glasnik srpskog učenog društva Knjiga 71 (Beograd: Srpsko učeno društvo, 1890)
- Ban, Matija: Djela I-VIII (Beograd: Kraljevsko-srpska državna štamparija, 1889–1892)

== See also ==
- Ignjat Job
- Ivan Stojanović
- Milan Rešetar
- Vicko Adamović
