= Unveiling of the Gundulić monument =

1893 event in Dubrovnik, modern-day Croatia

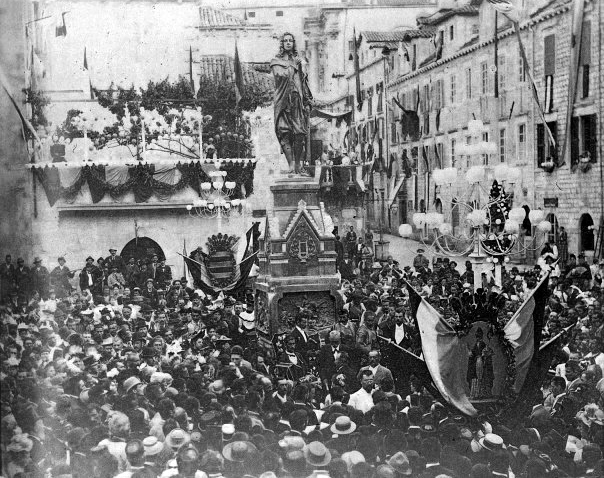
Official Unveiling Ivan Gundulić monument 1893

The unveiling of the Gundulić monument in Dubrovnik on May 20, 1893, was a symbolical event in the political history of Dubrovnik, since it brought to the surface the wider tensions between the two political sides of the city, the Croats and the Serb-Catholics in the pre-World War I political struggles in the region.

== The preparation ==
At its session of March 9, 1880, the Municipal Council of Dubrovnik adopted the proposition received from the "Dubrovnik Youth", an organization known as part of the Serb-Catholic movement in Dubrovnik, to raise a monument for the 300th anniversary of the birth of Gundulić in 1888. The mayor of the city at the time was Rafael "Rafo" Pucić. It was decided that a five-member committee would be nominated to oversee the monument's construction. The members were esteemed intellectuals Medo Pucić, Pero Budmani, Ivo Kaznačić, Mato Vodopić and Luko Zore. In 1882, the budget for the monument's erection was 11,000 florins.

In 1882, the oversight committee president Medo Pucić died, as did Ivan August Kaznačić in 1883. Mato Vodopić relinquished his membership when he was named Bishop in 1882, and Budmani also left the committee to focus on his work for the Academy's Dictionary; the work was hampered by lack of funding as well.

When the political coalition of the Serb-Catholic and Autonomist party members re-initiated work on it, the committee was reconstituted in 1891 with new members Marinica Giorgi, Lujo Bizzarro, Niko Bošković, Ivo Bogoević, Luko Bona, Brnja Caboga, Baldo Kostić, Vlaho Matijević, Jero Pugliesi, Stijepo Tomašević, Luko Zore and Nikola Ucov. The budget for the monument's erection was increased to 15,800 florins. The new committee organized new ways of funding, advertised the effort in newspapers and among various dignitaries, even reaching out to the emigrants in Argentina.

The monument was erected on May 20, 1893, in Dubrovnik's largest square, Poljana. It was made by the Croatian sculptor Ivan Rendić.

== The unveiling ==
The unveiling, like all the official celebrations in that period, was not only cultural, but also strongly national and political. The members of the Croatian Party of Rights and the Croatian People's Party tried to bring as many Croats as possible from various Croat regions to give the occasion a Croatian national and political character. On the other hand, the members of the Serb Party (Serb-Catholics) tried to gather as many Serbs-Catholics as possible to give a Serbian flavor to the celebration. Thus, the gathering became a symbol of division between opposing national movements.

It was officially revealed on July 26, 1893, by the last male member of the family, Baron Frano Getaldić-Gundulić (see House of Gundulić).

== Sources ==
- Grkeš, Ivan (2021). "Spomenik kao prijeporno mjesto. Trodnevna proslava otkrivanja Gundulićeva spomenika u Dubrovniku 1893. godine" [Monument as a Place of Controversy: A Three-Day Celebration Marking the Unveiling of Gundulić’s Monument in Dubrovnik in 1893]. Anali Zavoda za Povijesne Znanosti Hrvatske Akademije Znanosti i Umjetnosti u Dubrovniku (in Croatian). 59 (59): 205–241. doi:10.21857/ypn4oc1rq9.
