= Frančesko Micalović =

Ragusan printer

Frančesko Ratkov Micalović
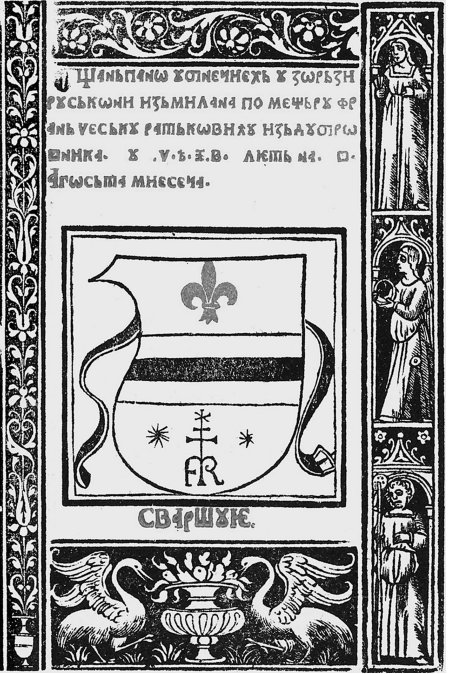
- Colophon of Officio (1512)
- Born: Ivan or Jovan Vukosalić
- Other names: Franciscus Ratchi Mizalovich, Franjo, Frano
- Occupation: printer
- Notable work: Officio and Molitvenik

Frančesko Ratkov Micalović was an early 16th-century Ragusan printer who printed the first books on vernacular language of population of contemporary Ragusa (modern-day Dubrovnik).

Micalović prepared Cyrillic script types and organized printing of prayer books in Venice in 1512. These prayer books are known as Molitvenik and Officio. Micalović was obliged to collect printed books and to sell them in his shop which he was to open in Dubrovnik and in Ottoman Serbia.

In sources, the language of these prayer books and the script in which it is printed is referred to as Bosnian, Ragusan, Serbian, Croatian, or Serbo-Croatian, depending on the point of view of its authors, and the Cyrillic script used to print them is in sources referred to as Bosančica.

== Family ==
Frančesko Micalović's birth name was Ivan. His grandfather was a book trader. Frančesko's father was Ratko Vukosalić whose nickname was Micalović. Ratko Vukosalić belonged to a group of Ragusans who had very good connections with Ottomans and was engaged in a special type of trade, ransom slavery. In Ragusan document composed on 23 August 1470 it was recorded that Ratko Vukosalić (with nickname Mazalović) paid to Ivan Marković from Croatia a ransom for certain Turk (Muslim) Mustafa. Ratko bought silver for this transaction from Grgur Sumičić from Novo Brdo. Ransom for Mustafa of 500 ducats was paid by Isa-Beg Ishaković who also had to release Marković's wife captured and kept in slavery in Sarajevo. On 16 September 1470 Ratko Vukosalić, acting as an agent of Živan Pripčinović, brought wife of Ivan Marković to Dubrovnik. At the beginning of 1471 Ratko Vukosalić bought a house. Ratko Vukosalić died before 1501. After a certain time Ratko's nickname became a family name inherited by his son Frančesko. Frančesko married Linusse (Lignussa which is diminutive of Lena), a daughter of famous Ragusan goldsmith Pavle Antoević.

== Career ==
Frančesko was also referred to as meštre (English: master craftsman) because he was not only a publisher but also a craftsman who cut paper and prepared types for printing. It is possible that Frančesko learned the skill of melting metal and engraving from his father-in-law, so he was able to prepare types for printing books on presses that belonged to Rusconi in 1512.

Mihailo Dinić discovered in Ragusan archives that Micalović signed two contracts in his attempt to publish Cyrillic script books for Ragusan Catholics. Micalović and Petar Đuro Šušić signed the first contract with Girolamo Soncino in Pesaro on 28 September 1510. It was agreed that Girolamo would print in his printing house several prayer books on Cyrillic script.

On 31 July 1511 Micalović signed an agreement with Šušić in which Micalović's name appears as Frančesko. According to this agreement Micalović and Šušić established a company in which Micalović invested his labour (personam suam) and the contract he signed earlier with Soncino, while Šušić invested 108 golden ducats. It was agreed that printed books were to be collected by Micalović who was obliged to distribute them in Dubrovnik (in a small shop he was to open for this purpose) and Serbia. On 20 August 1513 Micalović began his journey into the Ottoman-controlled territory of the Balkans to sell prayer books he printed. On that date, Micalović and Šušić signed another contract in which Micalović was obliged to return to Šušić all the money he received from selling prayer books.

== Cyrillic script Catholic prayer books ==
In 1512 Micalović printed two Catholic prayer books in Venice, in the printing house of Giorgio Rusconi (Zorzi Ruskoni) of Milan. One book is known as Officio (Officio Beatae Mariae Virginis) and the other as Molitvenik (Officio Sanctae Brigittae). Both books were printed in Cyrillic script with elements of Glagolitic in Shtokavian dialect after being translated from Chakavian. On 18 September 1512, immediately after his return to Ragusa, Micalović stated that two cases of Slavic books belonged to Đuro, father of Petar Šušić.

The four-part icon from church in the Orthodox Monastery of Virgin Mary's Birth in village Sogle, Čaška Municipality (near Veles, North Macedonia) have decorative elements painted under influence of Cyrillic Molitvenik printed by Micalović. According to Dejan Medaković, renaissance decorative elements of this 16th-century icon are directly copied from Molitvenik printed by Micalović.

== Polemics about the language ==
These two books were rediscovered to the scientific public in 1932 which initially referred to the language of these prayer books as Serbian. Depending on the point of view of its authors, the sources refer to these prayer books as Ragusan, Serbian, Croatian or Serbo-Croatian. The Cyrillic script used to print Micalović's prayer books is in sources referred to as Bosančica.

In the contract signed by Micalović, the language of the prayer book was referred to as in littera et idiomate serviano 'in the Serbian language and letters'. Milan Rešetar performed a detailed analysis of the letters, content, style and language of the prayer book and concluded that it is the first book printed on Serbian vernacular language because Oktoih (printed in 1494) was printed in Church Slavonic language.

In 1938 Rešetar, who was a Serb Catholic from Dubrovnik, published a prologue of the phototypic edition of Micalovićs books. In this prologue Rešetar stated "some letters used for printing of the prayer book were actually their own type of Cyrillic letters, based on cursive Cyrillic (Western Cyrillic), which at that time was not used to print works for religious texts of the Orthodox Church, and so the cursive was Cyrillic script regularly used by our Catholics and Muslims".

The detailed analysis of Rešetar's statements and books led Stjepan Ivšić to conclude that the language of these books was not Serbian, but Croatian. Rešetar's 1938 statement, which did not affect his opinion that the language of the prayer books was Serbian, also led Anica Nazor to conclusion that he refuted his position.

Ivšić thought the prayer book was a more modern version of the Vatican Croatian Prayer Book. Croatian philologist Dragica Malić thought that it was a translation of a slightly younger prayer book known as the Drugi vatikanski dubrovački molitvenik (Second Vatican Dubrovnik Prayer Book), dated to the turn of the 16th century.

== See also ==
- Bonino De Boninis

== Sources ==
- Maštrović, Tihomil (2005). Zbornik o Milanu Rešetaru: književnom kritičaru i filologu : zbornik radova s Međunarodnoga znanstvenog skupa : Beč 25. rujna 2004, Dubrovnik, 1.-2. listopada 2004. Hrvatski studiji Sveučilišta.
- Novak, Viktor (1951). Istoriski časopis.
- Zimmer, Szczepan Karol (1 January 1983). The Beginning of Cyrillic Printing in Crakow, 1491: From the Orthodox Past in Poland. Social Science Monographs. ISBN 978-0-88033-027-5.
- Nemirovskij, Evgenij Lʹvovic (1997). Bibliotheca bibliographica Aureliana. Valentin Koerner. ISBN 9783873201408.
- Božić, Ivan (1952). Dubrovnik i Turska u XIV i XV veku. Naučna knjiga.
- Nazor, Anica (2014). "Hrvatski ćirilički molitvenik iz 1512. godine" [The Croatian Cyrillic prayer book of 1512]. Filologija. 62. Zavod za lingvistička istraživanja, Croatian Academy of Sciences and Arts: 17–31. ISSN 1848-8919.
