= Čingrija =

Serbo-Croatian last name

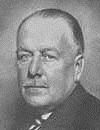
Melko Čingrija.

Čingrija is a Serbo-Croatian surname. Pero Čingrija (1837–1921) was one of four representatives of the People's Party that the Kingdom of Dalmatia elected in the 1911 Imperial Austrian elections. Melko Čingrija was the acting governor of the Yugoslav national bank between April 1934 and February 1935.
