= Serb Catholic =

Serb Catholic may refer to:

- Serb-Catholic movement in Dubrovnik – Politico-cultural movement in Dalmatia
- Catholic Church in Serbia
- Primate of Serbia (Roman Catholic) – Catholic archdiocese in Montenegro
