= Stijepo Kobasica =

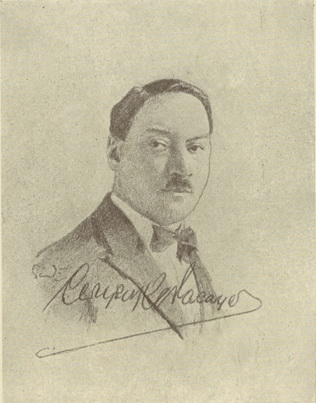
- Born: 1882; Dubrovnik, Kingdom of Dalmatia, Austrian Empire
- Died: 1944
- Citizenship: Austria-Hungary; Kingdom of Yugoslavia
- Known for: Srpski Glas; Prominent member of the Serb Catholic movement

Stijepo Kobasica (1882–1944) was a Dalmatian, and later Yugoslavian journalist, author and politician from Dubrovnik. He was the editor of Srpski Glas and a prominent member of the Serb Catholic movement in Dubrovnik.

== Early life ==
Kobasica was born at Dubrovnik in 1882, at that time a part of the Kingdom of Dalmatia of the Austro-Hungarian Empire. As a youth Kobasica researched his forebears and determined that they sprang from Serbian Orthodox stock from Herzegovina who had migrated to the coastal area of the Župa (between Dubrovnik and Cavtat in Dalmatia) during the time of Ottoman domination of the interior. Since his family had converted to Roman Catholicism generations before, the young man found himself firmly identifying with both his Serbian ethnic roots as well as his Catholicism. His thinking of this matter was undoubtedly influenced by that of his great grand-uncle, Valtazar Bogišić who was a very prominent Serb Catholic from Cavtat and one of the original proponents of South Slavic unification and independence from the Austro-Hungarian régime. Bogišić died in 1908 when Stijepo was twenty-six years old and already deeply entrenched in politics.

== Journalistic career ==
When in high school in Dubrovnik, Kobasica submitted an article to a local paper that was strongly critical of the régime. He was promptly expelled and had to move to Kotor to continue his education. Unable to resist his drive to political activism, further articles led to his expulsion from there as well, and it was in Mostar in the Bosnian military protectorate that he finally graduated. He pursued a philosophy degree at the University of Graz in Austria, and continued to write articles promoting the unification of the subjugated Slavic populations. Overhearing an insult to the King of Serbia while at Graz, he challenged the man to a duel from which he received a wound to his left arm.

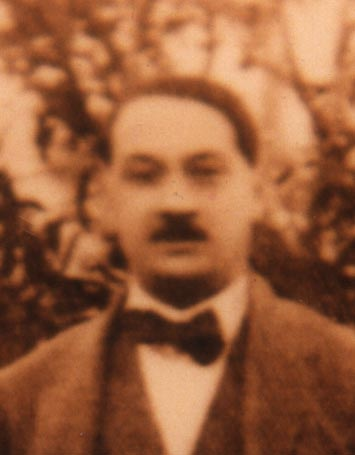
Stijepo Kobasica

Moving to Sarajevo in Bosnia-Herzegovina, a Habsburg protectorate for several decades, he lent his journalistic talents to the cause of its unification with the Kingdom of Serbia in a greater South Slav dominated state, becoming the editor of the Srpske Rieči (The Serbian Word) newspaper. For this in November 1906, the Imperial authorities arrested him for sedition and he was deported under guard to civic arrest in Dubrovnik, and forbidden to leave the town. At the time of his arrest in Sarajevo, the Serbian Journalist Association staged a rally in Belgrade condemning the Bosnian (Habsburg) Government. In 1907 he escaped to Belgrade where he met and married Pelagia Trifunović, a daughter of the former King Milan IV Obrenović by a Bulgarian opera singer, and they had a son together named after the child's royal grandfather Milan.

From 1912 to 1913, Kobasica published the "Srpski Glas", the organ of the Serb People's Radical Party in Croatia and Slavonia. He was also the author of three monographs entitled Srpsko-Bugarski Rat, "The Serbo-Bulgarian War", Sarajevo, 1913, Finale, and Stjepan Radić za vrijeme aneksione krize i svjetskoga rata "Stjepan Radić at the Time of the Annexation Crisis and the World War" (1924).

At the outbreak of the First World War, Kobasica brought his family back to Dubrovnik for their safety, but was promptly arrested again by the Austrian authorities and imprisoned in the fortress of Arad (in modern Romania) for the duration of the war.

After the war Kobasica returned briefly to Dubrovnik but found both his wife and son had died in his absence of tuberculosis. He then moved to Sarajevo and then to Belgrade where he was one of the editors of "Samouprava" (Self-government) in 1926 and subsequently an Avala News Agency journalist. Kobasica served as president of the Yugoslav Journalist Association Belgrade Section in 1925 and 1926. He also served the public, being elected as an MP in the Banjaluka electoral district as the Radical Party candidate for both the electoral counties of Prnjavor and Tešanj to the Skupština (National Assembly) at Belgrade as a member of the Radical Party under the Pašić government.

Kobasica married again, to Stojanka Nikolić and had a son, Aleksandar "Saša" with her, but both predeceased him, his son, a medical student, dying of tuberculosis aged 21. His two brothers were also prominent in their areas, Josip "Pepo" becoming a Supreme Court Judge at Sarajevo, and Marin, "Rinko", Director of the Dubrovnik Commercial Maritime Academy.

== Bibliography ==
- Gedö, Leopold (1926). Zbirka portreta i biografija znamenitih ljudi kraljevstva Srba, Hrvata i Slovenaca. Vienne, Impr. "Union".
- Banac, Ivo (1983). "The Confessional "Rule" and the Dubrovnik Exception: The Origins of the "Serb-Catholic" Circle in Nineteenth-Century Dalmatia". Slavic Review. Vol. 42, no. 3. pp. 448–474. JSTOR 2496046.
