= Bonino de Boninis =

Printing pioneer (15th–16th centuries)

- Born: 1454; Lastovo, Republic of Ragusa (modern Croatia)
- Died: 1528 (aged 73–74); Treviso
- Other names: Dobrić Dobričević, Dobruško Dobrojević
- Occupation: printer

Bonino de Boninis (also known as Dobrić Dobričević) one of the pioneers of printing in Europe, was born in 1454 on the small Adriatic Island of Lastovo in the Republic of Ragusa (modern Croatia).

Dobrić began to print books in 1478 when he joined Andrija Paltašić. He printed in Venice, Verona, Brescia and Lyon. His printed works included those of the ancient classics Tibullus, Catullus, Propertius, Virgil, Plutarch, Aulus Gellius, Aesop and Dante Alighieri's Divine Comedy. He was married to Drakula.

His works were considered among the best examples of printing in his epoch. His bilingual (Latin - Italian) editions of "Aesopus moralisatus, Dante's Cantica and Divine Comedy were printed first in Brescia in 1487, and then also in Lyon, France. We know of about 50 of his editions, the greatest number belonging to the period of 1483-1491 that he spent in Brescia - about 40. Croatia is in possession of 19 of his editions in 30 copies. The greatest number of his editions is in possession of the British Library, London.

In 1512 De Boninis printed a richly decorated Prayer Book in Cyrillic script; the only surviving copy is kept in the National Library of Paris.

De Boninis died in Treviso in 1528.

== See also ==
- Republic of Ragusa
- Lastovo
- Dalmatia
