= Antun Fabris =

Serbian journalist and politician (1864–1904)

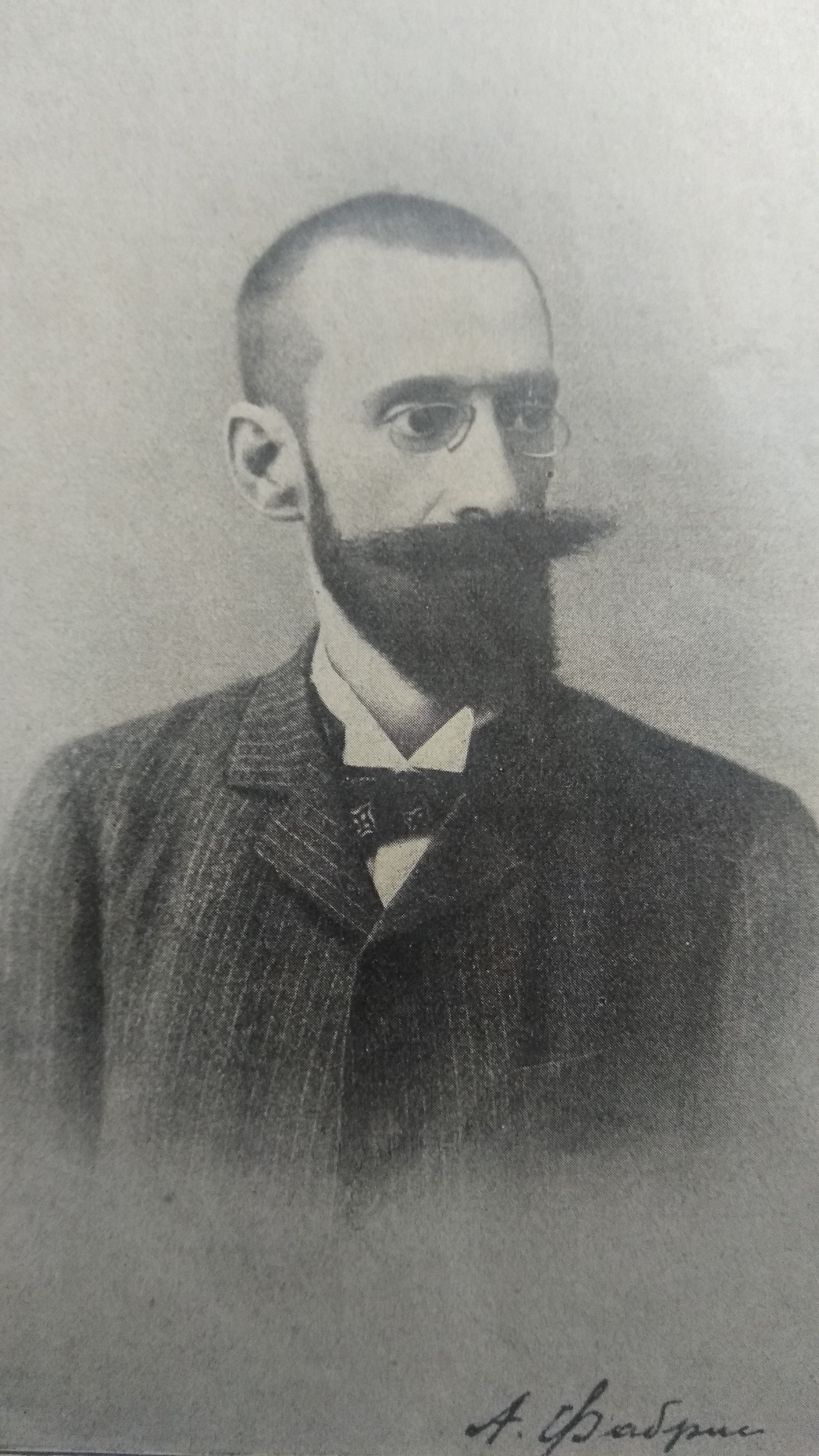
- Antun Fabris
- Born: 17 April 1864; Dubrovnik
- Died: 14 October 1904 (aged 40); Dubrovnik, Austria-Hungary
- Writing career
- Literary movement: Serb-Catholics

Antun Fabris (Serbian Cyrillic: Антун Фабрис; April 17, 1864 – October 14, 1904), was a journalist, essayist, publisher and politician from Dubrovnik who was one of the leaders of the Serb-Catholic movement in Dubrovnik.

== Biography ==
The ancestors of Antun Fabris came to the mainland from the island of Korčula. After finishing basic studies in Dubrovnik he went on to Vienna, where he graduated in Slavic studies from the university there in 1889. He was a teacher first in Split and then Zadar. In 1895 he became the owner, publisher and editor-in-chief of the prominent Dubrovnik newspaper. In 1902 he formed his own paper in Dubrovnik, the Srđ ("Срђ"), with his wife, and professor Luko Zore, the editor-in-chief, and the support of other Catholic Serbs. It was a cultural and literary journal for Serb intellectuals in Dalmatia.

As a respected Serb journalist, he was a Deputy President of the Pan-Serb Journalist Congress in Belgrade on 14 and 15 October 1902.

For publishing in the Srđ the song of Uroš Trojanović "Boccan night" (Bokeška noć) dedicated to the youth of Boka kotorska Antun was under ideological accusations arrested on 5 November 1902 and kept in prison until 23 December 1902. Three others were also arrested, interrogated and imprisoned, Uroš Trojanović, the author of the poem, Luko Zore, and Antun Pasarić, Fabris's co-editors. Fabris's term, however short in prison, greatly jeopardized his poor health, causing his premature death in 1904.

Fabris was also the manager of Dubrovnik's "Matica srpska". He contributed to the foundation of the Srpska Zora (Serb Dawn), a Dalmatian Serb cultural society in 1901.

== Legacy ==
Antun Fabris is noted for his role in maintaining a cultural identity during periods of political changes and restrictions in Dalmatia, but in Bosnia Herzegovina as well.

In 1940 a book entitled Izabrani članci Antuna Fabrisa (Selected articles by Antun Fabris) was published by Henrik Barić.
