= Jeremija Gagić =

Serbian politician (1783–1859)

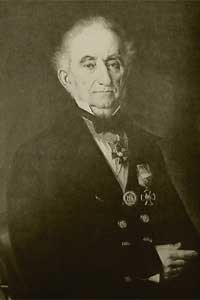
Jeremija Gagić

Jeremija Gagić (Serbian: Јеремија Гагић; also spelled Jeremij Gagich; 1783–1859) was a secretary of the Serbian State Council (Pravoteljstvujušči soviet serbski) in the First Serbian Uprising and later became a Russian diplomat, stationed in Dubrovnik for almost four decades. He corresponded with Prince-Bishops Petar I Petrović-Njegoš and Petar II Petrović-Njegoš and other leaders of his time, both secular and spiritual.

== Biography ==
Jeremija Gagić was born in Pretoke, a village situated in Knić municipality in Serbia on 1 May 1783, at a time when it was under the Ottoman yoke. His parents sent him to schools in Kragujevac and Zemun where he learned German during the time when the region was under Habsburg control for three years (1788-1791). Upon graduation he went into business as a trader of livestock in Zemun. All the while he maintained ties with Serbian insurgents who rose against Turkish oppression in 1804 and succeeded in liberating many towns. In March 1806, he moved from Zemun to Belgrade, which soon would become the capital of free Serbia, thanks to Karađorđe's brilliant tactics. Gagić entered the service of the Serbian State Council, first as a clerk and later as a secretary.

In August 1806, he went to Trieste with Avram Lukić in order to seek help from wealthy Serb merchants and shipowners for the insurrection—the war of independence. In November 1806, he went to the Austrian emperor in Vienna to open the Austria-Serbia border, and on 7 March 1807, as a member of a deputation sent by the Serbian State Council (Parliament) in Belgrade, he went first to Iași and then to Bucharest to see the Russian high command stationed there for the purpose of a joint action against the Turks. During his work, Gagić belonged to the Russophile stream of Karađorđe's opponents. When he was released from service at the end of 1807 as secretary of Milenko Stojković, he became a Stojković supporter, no longer Karađorđe's. After the expulsion of Stojković in 1811 and consequently Gagić, too, left Serbia and moved to the Russian service, first with the Danubian army, and from February 1813 to the Ministry of Foreign Affairs. By then, Serbia was reconquered by the Ottomans.

In December 1815, Gagić was transferred to the Russian consulate in Dubrovnik, where he remained until 1856 with the title of consul general. As a reward for long-term service, he was ennobled in 1850. Also, Nicholas I of Russia granted him an Imperial recognition (gramata) for his many merits in the Russian diplomatic service. Gagić also played an important political role because, through the Dubrovnik Consulate, subordinated to the Russian mission in Vienna, thus direct Russian-Montenegrin relations were maintained. Therefore, Gagić had very close ties with Montenegro's Prince-Bishops Petar I and Petar II and was the main reporter of the Russian government on the occasions. He strove to develop through Montenegro, Russian relations with Turkey and Austria, according to the intentions of the official Russian national policy. In this spirit, Gagić supported the activities of Ivan Vukotić and Mateja Vučićević in 1831-1832. He sometimes performed his mission with direct interventions in Montenegro itself in 1832, 1837, and 1851.

He died in Venice in 1859 at the age of 76.

== Literary work ==
Apart from his voluminous letter writings, Gagić took interest in the Dubrovnik archives where important state correspondence, private letters, and charters, written in Serbian Cyrillic and Serbian Latin recension by Ban Kulin, King Stefan Uroš, King Tvrtko, Ban Matej Ninoslav, and a member of the Asen dynasty, were kept. These manuscripts (letters and charters) were appropriated by Georgije Nikolajević in 1832 and sent to Russia for safekeeping as Serbian literary inheritance.
