= Nikša Gradi =

Writer, politician and lawyer from Dubrovnik

Nikša Gradi Nicolò Gradi
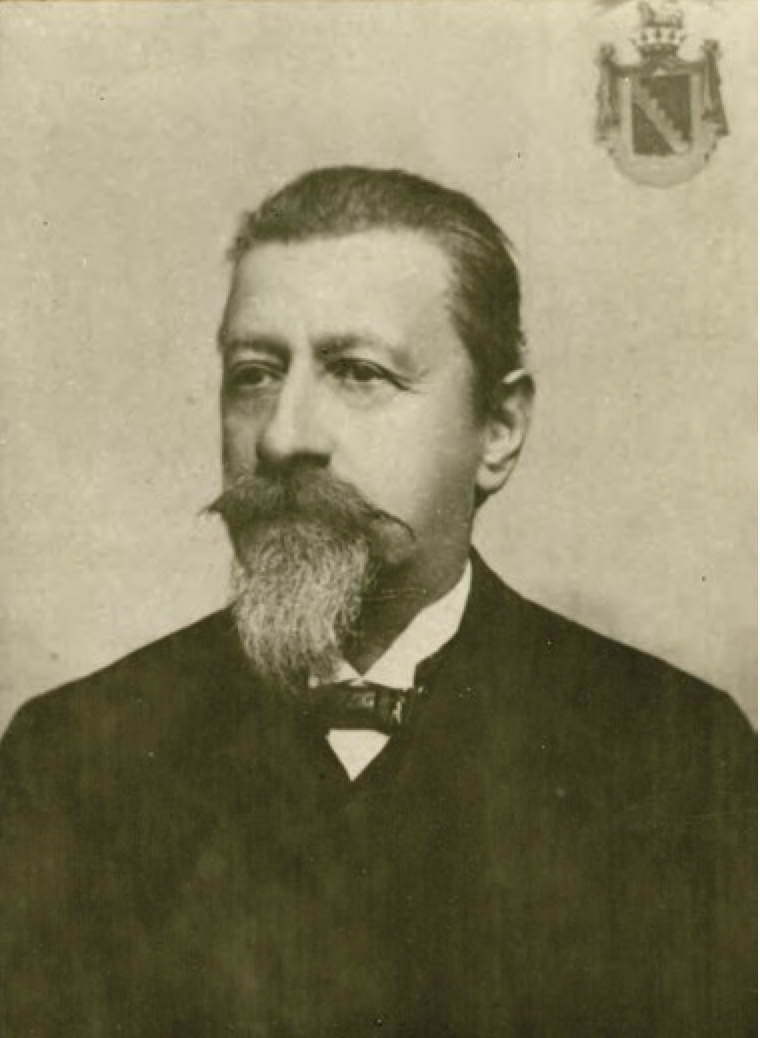
- Portrait of Nikša Gradić/Nicoló Gradi
- Born: 1825; Zadar, Kingdom of Dalmatia, Austria-Hungary (today's Croatia)
- Died: 1894 (aged 68–69); Dubrovnik, Kingdom of Dalmatia, Austria-Hungary (today's Croatia)
- Occupations: writer, politician and lawyer
- Writing career
- Notable work: Il poeta et il genio della terra.

Nikola "Nikša" Gradi (Italian: Nicolò Gradi; 1825–1894) was a writer, politician, and lawyer from Dubrovnik, a descendant of the Ragusan patrician family Gradi.

== Biography ==
Gradi was born in Zadar in 1825, where he attended the Gymnasium. After studying law in Padua, his judicial career led him to Dubrovnik, Split, Zadar, Rijeka and Kotor, then part of the Habsburg monarchy. Following retirement, he settled in Dubrovnik, devoting himself mainly to literature and politics. Apart from law, the scope of his erudition included classical, Italian and old Serbian literature.

Gradi was a miscellaneous writer, and his articles, sketches, polemics, poems and dramatic texts in both Italian and Serbian were published in supplements, calendars, pamphlets and books. He focused on the philological problem of the composition of Gundulić's Osman. His passion for old Ragusan writers and folk tradition urged him to write exclusively in Serbian in his mature years. His verse deals with patriotic and current political themes, advocating for the idea of the unity of South Slavs (Yugoslavism), whom he considered one nation composed of several tribes.

Gradi was initially a proponent of slovinstvo and the People's Party, and advocated for the use of a Yugoslav name instead of Croatian or Serbian in his 1884 article in the Slovinac journal, but later became disappointed by the opportunism of the People's Party and instead joined the Serb Party and declared himself a member of the Serb-Catholic movement in Dubrovnik.

His position on the Serb origin of the Slavonians, Dalmatians and Ragusans gave rise to considerable controversy with the adherents of the pro-Croatian People's Party and pro-Italian Autonomist Party.

During his service in Rijeka, his collection of poems Il poeta et il genio della terra appeared in print (1864). Despite an impressive level of erudition, he was not an original writer and failed to produce a major literary work, his importance today being primarily cultural and historical. The reason for this most certainly lies in the predominantly occasional character of his texts, often imbued with political ideas which have become anachronistic.

Nikša Gradi died in Dubrovnik in 1894 and was buried in Boninovo Cemetery in Dubrovnik.

== Works ==
- Il poeta et il genio della terra appeared in print (1864)

== See also ==
- Ignjat Job
- Ivan Stojanović
- Milan Rešetar

== Sources ==
- Lukežić, Irvin (August 2008). "Nobleman Nikša Gradić, Lawyer and Writer (1825–1894)". Anali Zavoda za povijesne znanosti Hrvatske akademije znanosti i umjetnosti u Dubrovniku (46): 137–225. ISSN 1848-7815.
