= Georgije Nikolajević =

Metropolitan bishop of Serbian Orthodox Church

His Eminence Georgije Nikolajević
- Metropolitan Bishop of Dabar and Bosnia
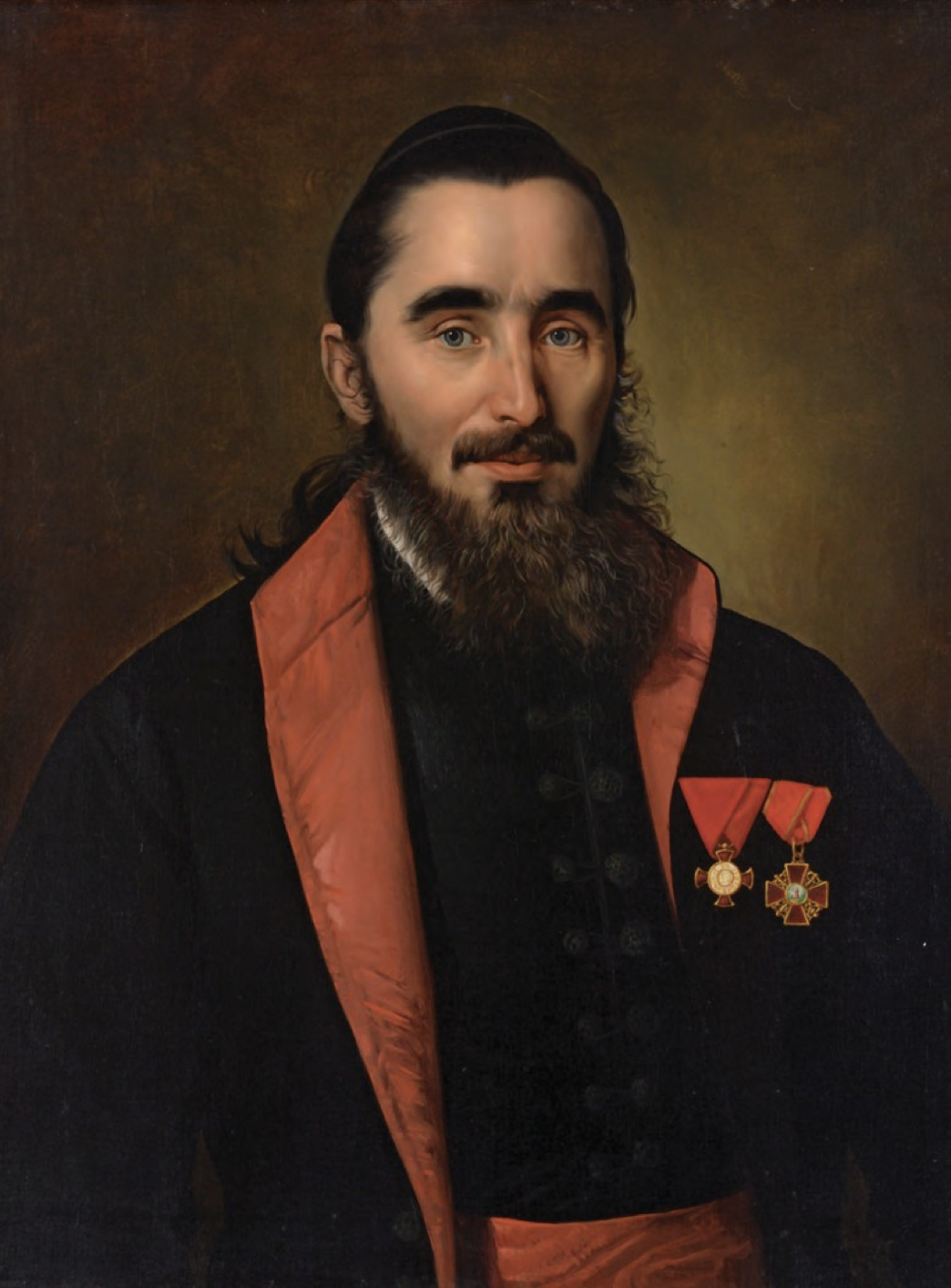
- Nikolajević in 1850
- Church: Serbian Orthodox Church
- Metropolis: Dabar and Bosnia
- Installed: 1885
- Term ended: 1896
- Predecessor: Sava Kosanović
- Successor: Nikolaj Mandić

Personal details
- Born: 20 April 1807 Jazak, Syrmia County, Austrian Empire
- Died: 8 February 1896 (aged 88) Sarajevo, Condominium of Bosnia and Herzegovina
- Denomination: Serbian Orthodox

Georgije Nikolajević (Serbian Cyrillic: Георгије Николајевић; secular name: Đorđe Nikolajević; 20 April 1807 – 8 February 1896) was a Serbian cleric, theologian, writer, professor and later in life Dabar and Bosnia. He was a member of the Serbian Learned Society and the Serbian Royal Academy of Sciences.

Georgije Nikolajević was also a teacher, priest, professor of the Theological Seminary in Zadar, a member of the Consistory of the Dalmatian Diocese, rector and professor of the Sarajevo-Reljevo Theological Seminary, and a member of the Consistory of the Metropolitanate of Dabar-Bosna. In his later years, he was elected Metropolitan of Dabar-Bosna. He was the initiator and member of various charitable cooperatives and funds. He was also engaged in literary work and edited the Serbian Dalmatian magazine.

== Childhood and schooling ==
Georgije Nikolajević was born in the village of Jaško in Srem on 20 April 1807 as Đorđe Nikolajević. He was born in a priestly family to father Simeon and mother Vasilije. He finished primary school in his native village. After primary school, from 1817 to 1819, he went to a German school in Sremska Mitrovica, and after that, he enrolled in the grammar school in Sremski Karlovci. After high school, he enrolled in the seminary of Sremski Karlovci.

== Teacher ==
He graduated from the seminary in 1828. After graduating from the seminary, he worked for a year as a teacher in Irig. Then, in the fall of 1829, he went to Pest and enrolled in philosophy studies, but stayed there for a short time because he responded to Metropolitan Stefan's invitation to be a teacher in Dubrovnik.

He came to Dubrovnik on 22 December 1829, and opened a Serbian school on New Year's Eve in 1830. A month later, the Austro-Hungarian authorities closed the school under the pretext that Nikolajević, as a priest, could not hold the school. When it was proven that he was not a priest, he was allowed to hold classes at home, but that permit was soon revoked.

== As priest and author ==
On 6 May 1833, the Dalmatian bishop Josif Rajačić ordained him to the rank of deacon, and on 11 May to the rank of priest. On 1 June, Bishop Josif Rajačić issued him a sinjelija for the parish priest of Dubrovnik, and he was confirmed by the government on 16 October. Nikolajević became the first Serbian priest in Dubrovnik in 1833. As a priest, he opened a Serbian school near the church, which was called "catechism." This school operated until 1848, when a public Serbian school was opened. The Austro-Hungarian government recognized the school, and the municipality brought another priest, who was a chaplain and teacher. On 8 January 1836, the Bishop of Dalmatia, Pantelejmon Živković, awarded him a red belt for his zeal in the field of education and as an exemplary priest.

Apart from the priestly vocation of Georgije Nikolajević, he inspired and cultivated the Serb-Catholic Circle. He also wrote and edited for Serbian publications in Dubrovnik. He succeeded Božidar Petranović, who hired him as managing editor of the "Serbian-Dalmatian Magazine" (Srbsko-dalmatinski magazin). Nikolajević collaborated with Teodor Pavlović's "Serbian People's List" (1838). From 1842 to 1862, he edited 15 volumes of the Serbian Dalmatian magazine. His most important work is a collection entitled Srpski spomenici ili stare risovule, diplome, povela i snošenja bosanski, serbski, hercegovački, dalmatinski i dubrovački kraleva, careva, banova, despota, knezeva, voivode, i vlastelina ("Serbian Monuments or old Chrysobulls, diplomas, charters, and relations of Bosnian, Serbian, Herzegovinian, Dalmatian, and Dubrovnik kings, emperors, bans, despots, and lords"). In 1840, he published the moral-educational text "A Young Man How to Educate Himself".

He also published his works in the Grlica calendar, the Chronicle of Matica Srpska, and other magazines. Due to his contribution in the field of literature, on 11 July 1842, he was elected a corresponding member of the Serbian Learned Society in Belgrade. On April 28, 1846, the Dalmatian bishop Jerotej (Mutibarić) made him archpriest. On 7 July 1850, the Austro-Hungarian Emperor Franz Joseph I awarded him the Golden Cross of Merit. Tsar Nicholas I of Russia gave him a diamond ring worth 500 rubles for editing the Srbsko-dalmatinski magazin, the Serbian Dalmatian magazine. At about the same time (1850), Nikolajević was corresponding with Petar II Petrović-Njegoš, a year before the great Serbian poet died. On New Year's Eve in 1853, a ring was presented to him by the Russian consul Jeremija Gagić of Dubrovnik.

Georgije Nikolajević had a large number of friends among the celebrities of his day. Among his friends, Vuk Karadžić, Pavle Tvrtković, Božidar Petranović, Serafim Perović, the writer Archimandrite Nićifor Dučić, the metropolitans: Stefan Stratimirović, Josif Rajačić, Petar II Petrović Njegoš, bishops Pantelejmon Živković, Jerotej Mutibarić stand out. He also knew many Serbian and Russian writers.

In 1852 he went to Belgrade and met with Serbia's prime minister Ilija Garašanin and had an audience with Prince Aleksandar Karađorđević at his invitation. Nikolajević was offered to tutor Prince Petar Karađorđević but after he delayed the decision, the prince took another tutor.

After 28 years of priestly service in Dubrovnik, Father Georgije Nikolajević was transferred to Zadar in 1858, where he was appointed professor at the seminary there. As early as 29 April 1860, he was appointed a consistory archpriest, but he continued to serve as a professor at the theological institute. The following year, Nikolajević and several priests in Zadar established a fund for priestly widows and orphans. He invested in that fund even after leaving Zadar.

Nikolajević was also known in Russia. On the occasion of the thousandth anniversary of the existence of Russia, the Tsar Aleksandar endowed him in 1862 with the Order of St. Anne of the III class. In 1862, he was elected to the board of 12 people for school and church books, and to the board of "Matica Dalmatinska", where he was the vice president of the Literary Board. In 1864, he was elected an honorary member of Matica Srpska in Novi Sad. The following year, 1865, the Dalmatian bishop Stefan Knezević decorated him.

He was appointed an honorary member of the "Society of Charity and Mutual Aid of the Slavs", founded in Constantinople in 1870. By the imperial decision of December 27, 1873, he was appointed a member of the Provincial School Council of Dalmatia for six years, but his mandate was renewed once again. From 1 September 1880, he was an honorary member of "Sloga", the Serbian Singing Society of Dubrovnik at the time.

In 1879, he published the work "Protopresbyter and His Dignity", in 1880 "Protopresbyter's Attack Rejects the Protopresbyter" and a work entitled "Biography and Charities of Božo Bošković" about a wealthy Serbian merchant (1815–1879) whom he knew personally. In addition to writing literary works, he translated various works, wrote poems, articles, and newspaper articles that he rarely signed.

After more than two decades spent in Zadar, Georgije Nikolajević moved to Sarajevo in December 1881. There he drafted the statute for the Consistory, which began its work on 15 November 1882. He also compiled a rulebook for the seminary, approved on 19 October 1882.

== Monasticism ==
It is not known the exact year when Đorđe Nikolajević became a monk and received the monastic name of Georgije Nikolajević, but it is known that Metropolitan Sava (Kosanović) wanted to make him an archimandrite immediately upon his arrival in Sarajevo, which Georgije did not want. It is known that Emperor Franz Joseph appointed him archimandrite and vice-president of the Metropolitan Consistory on 17 October 1882 and that Metropolitan Sava Kosanović (1881–1885) of the Metropolitanate of Dabar-Bosna issued a decree on 20 October 1882, stating that on 19 November 1882, he would be promoted to the rank of Archimandrite.

As an archimandrite, he started the newspaper Dabrobosanski Istočnik, which was intended for the clergy. He also had great merits for the opening of the seminary in Sarajevo, which was opened on 30 October 1882. In the newly opened seminary, he performed the duty of rector and taught the Church Slavonic language. He performed this duty until he was elected metropolitan. At the Epiphany in 1883, Metropolitan Sava Kosanović gave him the archimandrite miter and gave him the blessing that the sea should always carry him.

== Proclamation of Metropolitan ==
Nikolajević in his later years

Under the pressure of the Viennese court, Metropolitan Sava (Kosanović) had to resign, which was adopted on 10 September 1885, and the court declared Georgije Nikolajević the administrator of the Metropolitanate of Dabar-Bosna. In 1885, the Patriarchate of Constantinople elected him Dabar and Bosnia. He was ordained metropolitan on 2 February 1886. For the first year as a metropolitan, he visited every Orthodox house in Sarajevo. During his time as Metropolitan, Georgije Nikolajević ordained 7 deacons, 2 hierodeacons, 75 priests, and 4 hieromonks. While he was metropolitan, he consecrated 35 newly built and renovated churches, and he opened another 17. 52 new churches were renovated and opened. He also made a new division of parishes. He provided state aid for priests from about 50 parishes, who could not provide for them. He also provided state aid for poor churches. Every year, 5–6 parish homes were built, and that was also financed by the state.

Many churches in Bosnia, as well as in Herzegovina, did not have church books, which is why the liturgy was not served in many churches. Georgije Nikolajević solved this problem by reprinting Russian church books in Sarajevo at the expense of the state.

Metropolitan Nikolajević helped all activities that had a Serbian character. When a committee for the erection of a monument to the Serbian writer Sima Milutinović Sarajlija was established in Sarajevo, the Metropolitan invited the parish clergy to join in collecting donations for the erection of the monument.

He also founded the "Fund for Support of Widows and Orphans of Priests, Serbian-Orthodox Church in the Diocese of Dabar-Bosna", and on 22 February 1890, he called on the clergy to support the establishment of the fund and to help it come to life. The Metropolitan himself contributed 800 forints to the fund and bequeathed another 3,000 forints in his will. He also ordered that the priest who comes to the new parish give half of the income to the family of the previously deceased priest. He also called on priests to make donations for the construction of new churches. With his great gift of £15,000. The Metropolitan built a Serbian school in Blažuj in 1891.

On the eve of the Feast of the Assumption of the Blessed Virgin Mary in 1892, Metropolitan Nikolajević visited Bosanska Gradiška, where the parish clergy and the people prepared a magnificent welcome for him. Touched by this welcome, he gave the citizens of Gradiška a foundation of 9,000 forints, which they used to erect a new parochial school building in the churchyard.

By 1893, he had donated charitable contributions of about 70,000 forints from his savings. In his will, he also determined a lot of money for charitable donations, so that he gave a total of 135,523 forints to charity.

== Personal life ==
He married Katarina (Ekaterina), the daughter of the Kotor merchant Marko Berberović and Marija Zloković, in April 1833 in Kotor. He had two children, a son and a daughter, but they both died young. His wife Katarina died on 10 March 1866.

== Death and burial ==
Metropolitan Georgije Nikolajević served his last hierarchical service on 21 November 1895, at the Introduction in the Old Church in Sarajevo. After that, he got sick and he rarely got out of bed. On 2 February 1896, he received several corporations and deputations that congratulated him on the tenth anniversary of his appointment as metropolitan. Shortly afterward, he died – on 8 February 1896.

A special program was prepared for his funeral. For two days, his remains were exhibited in the great hall of the Metropolitanate of Dabar-Bosna. He was transferred to the Old Church on the 23 of February and Metropolitan Nikolaj (Mandić) of Tuzla served the Liturgy and the memorial service there. A priest Đorđe Bjelanović gave a speech at the memorial service. The body remained in the Old Church until the next day. The next day, the body was transferred to the New Church in Sarajevo where a funeral service was held.

The Church of Saint Sava in Blažuj was completed in 1897, then on 21 September, the church was consecrated by Metropolitan Nikolaj (Mandić) of Dabar and Bosnia. A year after the consecration, the remains of Metropolitan Georgije Nikolajević were transferred to the church. On 20 September 1898, the coffin was lowered into the new tomb of the church in Blažuj. A member of the Académie Française, Henri Jean Baptiste Anatole Leroy-Beaulieu, was also present at the transfer of the remains to the Serbian Orthodox church of Blažuj.

About the Austro-Hungarian Emperor Franz Joseph, the old man Georgije Nikolajević received the Order of the Iron Crown with a star and a ribbon for his merits.
