= Frano Kulišić =

Frano Kulišić (Serbian Cyrillic: Франо Кулишић; 4 December 1884 - 18 October 1915) was a literary historian. He was a member of the Serb-Catholic movement in Dubrovnik.

He was an active member of Serbian literary society Matica srpska in Dubrovnik.

== Biography ==
Frano Kulišić was born in Dubrovnik, Austria-Hungary, and graduated from the Dubrovnik Gymnasium in 1903, studied Slavic studies in Vienna in 1909 and wrote the thesis "Dživo Bunić Vučićević: Ein literarhistorischer Beitrag zur lyrischen Poesie des 17. Jahrhunderts" published in Ragusa.

Kulišić was the first custodian of the Baltazar Bogišić memorial collection in 1909.

During his studies he ran the library of Vatroslav Jagić. He was the secretary of the Matica srpska in Dubrovnik from 1913 to 1914.

In 1913, he was the host of the celebration of Saint Blaise, the city of Dubrovnik's patron saint, one of the few Serb Catholics to be chosen for that honor at the turn of the century.

Kulišić was an activist of the Dubrovnik Workers' Association and vice-president of the Serbian Gymnastics Association "Dušan Silni". He was arrested as a member of the Yugoslav-oriented nationalist youth in July 1914 and interned in Wolfsegg, Austria, where he died of pneumonia. He collaborated with literary critics, philological and historical reviews, articles on Dubrovnik poets and theater, and sketches and notes on customs and historical events in the Dubrovnik region in periodicals Croatia (1900), Srđ (1904–07), Dubrovnik (1905–10, 1914), Srpski književni glasnik (Belgrade 1906–07, 1913–14), Crvena Hrvatska (1908), Naše jedinstvo (1908), Smotra dalmatinska (1909) and Bosanska vila (1910).

It wasn't until 5 November 1937 that his remains were repatriated, and reburied in his hometown Dubrovnik.
