= Serb-Catholic movement in Dubrovnik =

Politico-cultural movement in Dalmatia

The Serb-Catholic movement in Dubrovnik (Serbo-Croatian: Дубровачки србокатолички покрет / Dubrovački srbokatolički pokret) was a cultural and political movement of people from Dubrovnik who, while Catholic, declared themselves Serbs, while Dubrovnik was part of the Habsburg-ruled Kingdom of Dalmatia in the 19th and early 20th centuries. Initially spearheaded by intellectuals who espoused strong pro-Serbian sentiments, there were two prominent incarnations of the movement: an early pan-Slavic phase under Matija Ban and Medo Pucić that corresponded to the Illyrian movement, and a later, more Serbian nationalist group that was active between the 1880s and 1908, including a large number of Dubrovnik intellectuals at the time. The movement, whose adherents are known as Serb-Catholics (Срби католици / Srbi katolici) or Catholic Serbs (католички Срби / katolički Srbi), largely disappeared with the creation of Yugoslavia.

== Background ==
Ragusa was founded in the 7th century by refugees from Epidaurum, a Roman city situated some 15 km to the south, when that city was destroyed by Slavs fighting with the Avars. During its first centuries the city was under the rule of the Byzantine Empire. It was one of the Dalmatian city-states. In the 12th and 13th centuries, Dubrovnik grew into an oligarchic republic, and benefited greatly by becoming a commercial outpost for the rising and prosperous Serbian state. After the Crusades, Dubrovnik came under the sovereignty of Venice (1205–1358), which would give its institutions to the Dalmatian city. By the Peace Treaty of Zadar in 1358, Dubrovnik achieved relative independence as a vassal-state of the Kingdom of Hungary. Between the 14th century and 1808, Dubrovnik ruled itself as a free state, although it was a tributary from 1382 to 1804 of the Ottoman Empire and paid an annual tribute to its sultan. On 27 May 1806, the forces of the Empire of France occupied the neutral Republic of Ragusa. In 1808 Marshal Marmont issued a proclamation abolishing the Republic of Ragusa and amalgamating its territory into the French Empire's client state, the Napoleonic Kingdom of Italy. At the Congress of Vienna, Ragusa and the territories of the former Republic were made part of the crown land of the Kingdom of Dalmatia, ruled by the Habsburg monarchy, which became known as Austria-Hungary in 1867, which it remained a part of until 1918.

The use of the Croatian language in everyday speech increased in late 13th century, and in literary works in mid-15th century. At the end of the 14th century, inhabitants of the republic were mostly native speakers of Croatian, referred to by them as Croatian, Slavic, or Illyrian at the time. Most sources from the later medieval and early modern period simply refer to Dubrovnik's Slavic inhabitants generically as "Slav" and their language as "Slavic." A number of writers from the 16th to the 19th century (before the Age of Romantic National Awakenings) were explicit in declaring themselves as Croats and their language as Croatian. In the coming decades, Dubrovnik became a cradle of Croatian literature.

Originally, Latin was used in official documents of the Republic. Italian came into use in the 1420s. Both languages were used in official correspondence by the Republic. To oppose the demographic change due to increased Slavic immigration from the Balkans, the native Romance population of Ragusa, which made up the oligarchic government of the Republic, tried to prohibit the use of any Slavic languages in official councils. When Ragusa was part of the Napoleonic Kingdom of Italy, between 1808 and 1810, Italian was still in official use. Croatian was normally spoken among lower classes, Italian among the upper. Ragusans were in general bilingual, speaking Croatian in common day-to-day duties and Italian in official occasions or mixing both. There also were Ragusan authors of Morlachism, a primarily Italian and Venetian literary movement.

Before the 19th century, it is difficult to ascertain the precise number of residents in Dubrovnik who self-identified as Serbs. With the increased emphasis on ethnic distinction in the nineteenth century, there are increased references to Serbs and Croats as distinct peoples of Dubrovnik. The Republic of Ragusa had enforced a single state religion of Roman Catholicism, before it was abolished in 1808. The Eparch of Dalmatia Josif Rajačić dispatched the first Orthodox priest to Dubrovnik, Georgije Nikolajević, in 1833. Orthodoxy was given equal status with Catholicism only in 1848, by which time there were hundreds of Orthodox immigrants from Herzegovina in the city who maintained their religious affiliation with the Serbian Orthodox Church.

== Early 19th century ==
In the 19th century, the politics of Dubrovnik started to include the matter of the city's belonging - with the emergence of romantic nationalism like the Illyrian movement and the emergence of the Kingdom of Serbia, and a resistance to the inclusion of Dubrovnik into the Kingdom of Dalmatia. The city, while Catholic, had centuries of historical connections to its mostly Orthodox hinterland, which were emphasized both through the propaganda of contemporary Serbia as well as through the numerous contacts of the city's intelligentsia with Serbia and Montenegro.

The cultural and political movement of Serbs in Dubrovnik was started around this time, notably by Nikolajević's 1838 article in the newspaper Srbsko-Dalmatinski Magazin (published in Zadar by Božidar Petranović), where he claimed the entire Ragusan Slavonic literary corpus for Serbian literature.

In 1841, Medo Pucić, a writer from an old Catholic noble family, became acquainted with pan-Slavists Ján Kollár and Pavel Jozef Šafárik, and started to espouse a Serb national sentiment. Medo Pucić was the first person to publicly call himself a Serb, while at the same time believing that the Croatian name for the language he spoke was merely a synonym of the Serbian name, so he was effectively an adherent of slovinstvo, a pan-Slavic view of South Slavic nationalities. The literary magazine Slovinac, founded by Pucić and others in 1878, would reflect these views.

Matija Ban, another Catholic from Dubrovnik, was influenced by pan-Slavists and romantic nationalists Michał Czajkowski and František Zach in Istanbul, so much that he moved to Belgrade in 1844 in an attempt to promote his idea that Serbian patriotism must extend beyond Serbian Orthodoxy and the borders of the Principality of Serbia. In Serbia, Ban's group of enthusiasts worked with Serbia's minister of the interior Ilija Garašanin, the author of Načertanije, to enter the upper reaches of Serbian political life. They were not, however, met with uniform acceptance - Jovan Sterija Popović and others, with support of the Church in Serbia, protested against their ideas and by extension against Vuk Karadžić's notion that Serbian language and nationality extended beyond Orthodoxy.

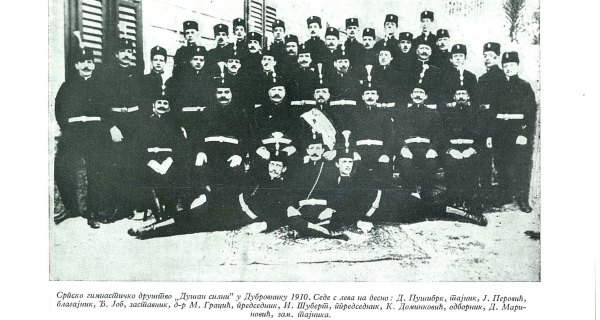
Serb sports society Dušan the Mighty with Dr.Mato Gracić in the center, Dubrovnik, 1910

During the Revolutions of 1848 in the Habsburg areas (1848-1849), the Serbian government was involved on the side of the South Slavs in Serbian Vojvodina, and at the same time Matija Ban traveled to Croatian lands and advocated for pan-Slavic as well as pro-Serbian ideas, claiming the Kingdom of Dalmatia should be unified with the Kingdom of Croatia-Slavonia, but also describing the language of Dubrovnik as Serbian. By 1850, the revolution was over and Ban, particularly because he had acquired Serbian citizenship in 1844, became suspicious to the Austrian police in Dubrovnik, who started to monitor him. At that point, he was summoned to Belgrade where Garašanin suspended all of his operations and ordered him to permanently return to Belgrade. He hesitated, but was persuaded by Prince Aleksandar and others to comply. He did however leave his family in Dubrovnik and published two more issues of the journal Dubrovnik in Ljudevit Gaj's publishing house in Zagreb in 1851 and 1852.

== Late 19th century ==
The political reality of Dubrovnik of the latter half of the 19th century was rather bleak, with the historical city being relegated to an insignificant periphery of the Austro-Hungarian Monarchy, and this had a significant impact on the local politics and the emergence of the Serb-Catholic movement.

Three decades after Ban and Pucić, in the 1880s a sizable group of Ragusan intellectuals independently developed a Serb-Catholic feeling, but at that point it was a political movement that was openly hostile to the Croats and whose leaders cooperated with the pro-Italian Autonomist Party (i.e. it was not pan-Slavic).

Following the 1878 Congress of Berlin, the Habsburg Empire occupied Bosnia and created the Austro-Hungarian Condominium of Bosnia and Herzegovina, which prompted a confrontation between the Serb and Croat national ideologies, and the new "Serb-Catholic" circle of Dubrovnik increasingly broke with the pan-Slavic tradition of its founders, Pucić and Ban. The same year, Serbia obtained independence.

In the preparation for the Imperial Council election of 1879, the Serb Party of Dalmatia severed ties with the People's Party, which marked a significant shift in Dalmatian politics at the time. Subsequently, in 1890, a coalition of the Autonomist Party and the Serb Party won the municipal election in Dubrovnik, where the Autonomists were considered to be "Serb-Catholics". In the elections of 1899, local Croats saw their big mistake and a coalition of the People's Croatian Party (from 1899 new name of the People's Party in Dalmatia) and the Party of Rights came into power.

There was substantial local controversy over the unveiling of the Gundulić monument that was planned since 1880 but was ultimately delayed to 1893.

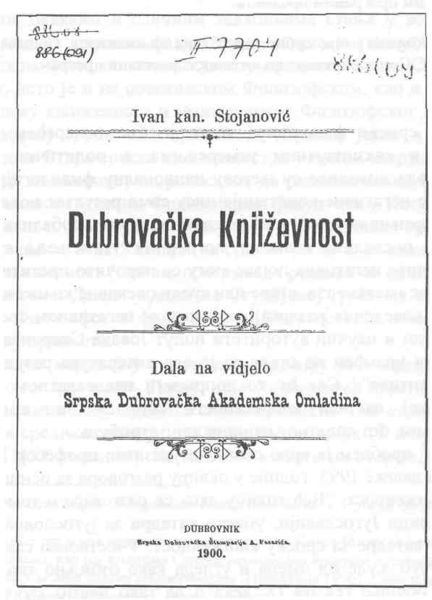
Literature of Dubrovnik, published by the Serb Academic Youth of Dubrovnik (1900).

In 1904/1905, a cultural society "Croatian and Serbian People's Home" from Cavtat (south of Dubrovnik) promulgated pan-Slavic ideas.

In 1908, with the Austrian annexation of Bosnia and Herzegovina, all Serbian unions, clubs and newspapers in the city were closed and forbidden by Austrian authorities, which led to massive emigration of Serbian-oriented high society from the city of Dubrovnik.

Matica Srpska of Dubrovnik was founded in 1909 by the last will of Serbian businessman Konstantin Vučković.

The movement gradually shut down because the process of general political alignment of Croats and Serbs that happened in the beginning of the 20th century had eliminated its reason for existence, as the creation of Yugoslavia accomplished an integration with Serbia.

== Legacy ==
After World War I, in the Kingdom of Yugoslavia those Serbs who were left in Dubrovnik opted for the Yugoslav national unity, in contrast to Croats in the city who opted for the preserving of autonomous status of Croatia in Yugoslavia and unification of Dalmatia with Croatia-Slavonia.

Serbian Orthodox bishop in Dalmatia Nikodim Milaš wrote negatively in his memoirs about the movement in the context of the late 1890s, saying: "They imagined that all the liberal Croats would have been attracted by their programme and that they would have become 'Catholic Serbs' too. But they have not realized that all this Catholic Srpstvo gathered together only a dozen or even less of Dubrovnik's ambitious learned people, which attracted maybe one hundred or so ignorant or almost ignorant citizens, by means of economic subvention; furthermore, for those ambitious learned people this Catholic Srpstvo was and is nothing more than an empty self-promotion".

In a personal correspondence with author and critic dr. Milan Šević in 1932, Marko Murat complained that Orthodox Serbs are not acknowledging the Catholic Serb community on the basis of their faith.

Historiography in Croatia and Serbia hasn't covered this phenomenon neutrally - a large amount of Serbian works about it have been subjective and nationalist, trying to excessively emphasize it, while Croatian works have conversely tended to downplay it. Maciej Czerwiński stated that the Serb-Catholic movement had inconsistencies and shortcomings in the linguistic, cultural and ethnic proving of the Serbian identity of Dubrovnik.

== Organisations ==
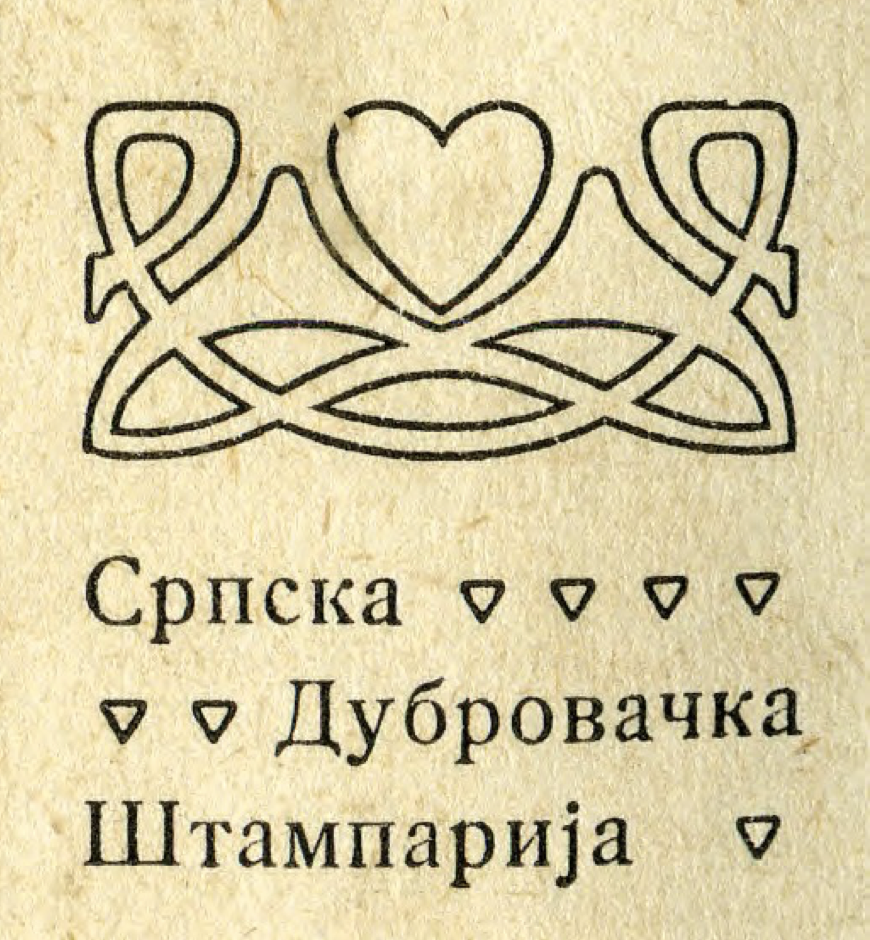
Logo of Serb Dubrovnik printhouse

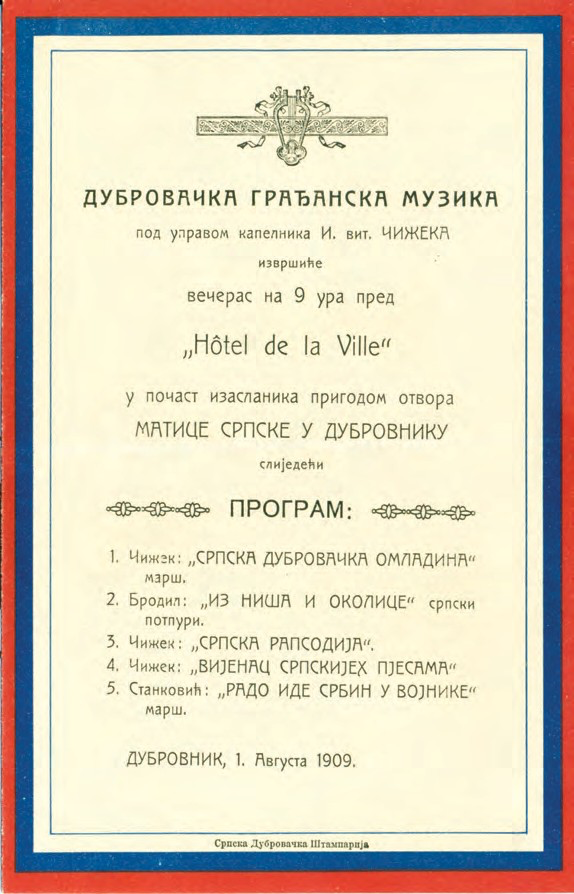
Music concert program held in honour of founding Matica Srpska in Dubrovnik, 1909

- Zadruga Srpkinja Dubrovkinja - founded in 1887
- Srpska dubrovačka akademska omladina (Serb Academic Youth of Dubrovnik) - founded in 1900
- Srpska Zora - founded in 1901
- Gimnastičko-sokolsko društvo Dušan Silni - founded in 1907 and headed by Mato Gracić
- Matica srpska - founded in 1909, funded and found by Konstantin Vučković
- Pasarićeva štamparija
- Štamparija Mata Gracića
- Savez srpskih zemljoradničkih zadruga
- Srpska štedionica

== Notable people ==
- Matija Ban (1818–1903), writer
- Medo Pucić (1821–1882), Ragusan nobleman
- Nikša Gradi (1825–1894), writer
- Ivan Stojanović (1829–1900), Catholic clergyman
- Konstantin Vojnović (1832–1903), politician
- Valtazar Bogišić (1834–1908), jurist and sociologist
- Pero Budmani (1835–1914), writer
- Vicko Adamović (1838–1919), pedagogue and historian
- Luko Zore (1846–1906), philologist
- Marko Car (1859–1953), writer
- Milan Rešetar (1860–1942), linguist and historian
- Antun Fabris (1864–1904), writer
- Marko Murat (1864–1944), painter
- Lujo Vojnović (1864–1951), politician and writer
- Melko Čingrija (1873-1949), politician
- Stijepo Kobasica (1882–1944), writer
- Petar Kolendić (1882–1969), writer and literary historian

== See also ==
- Dubrovnik Prayer Book
- Serb People's Party (Dalmatia)
- Serbian Revival
- Serbs in Croatia

== Sources ==
- Banac, Ivo (1983). "The Confessional "Rule" and the Dubrovnik Exception: The Origins of the "Serb-Catholic" Circle in Nineteenth-Century Dalmatia". Slavic Review. 42 (3): 448–474. doi:10.2307/2496046. JSTOR 2496046.
- Lodge, R. Anthony; Pugh, Stefan (2007). Language contact and minority languages on the littorals of Europe. Logos Verlag. ISBN 978-3832516444.
- Mladineo, Goran (2012). "Nikola TOLJA, Dubrovački Srbi katolici – istine i zablude, vlastita naklada, Dubrovnik, 2011., 711 str". Journal of Contemporary History (in Croatian). 44 (3). Croatian Institute of History: 800–803. ISSN 0590-9597.
