= Uroš Trojanović =

Serbian poet

Uroš Trojanović (Serbian Cyrillic: Урош Тројановић; Rose, Herceg Novi, Montenegro, 1882 - Dubrovnik, 19 December 1903) was a Serbian poet and journalist.

== Biography ==
Uroš Trojanović was born in the village of Rose near Herceg Novi in 1882. He attended the Dubrovnik Gymnasium. He was among the leaders of Dubrovnik's Serbian youth and opposed the Austrian regime. In the Gymnasium of 1900, together with the ardent Serbian Catholic Stjepan Kobasić, he began publishing a handwritten copy of the secret student (Serbian-oriented) newspaper Poma, which was taken over in 1901 by a high school student, a young Serbian Catholic Petar Kolendić. He was arrested in November 1902 for publishing the song "Bokeška noć" in the magazine Srđ. The second edition of the 19th issue of Srđ in 1902 was partially censored due to the publication of his poem Bokeška noć (Boccan Night). He died shortly after leaving school, probably as a result of imprisonment at the Rector's Palace.

Marko Urošev, a possible ancestor of Trojanović from Luštica, was also imprisoned in the middle of the 18th century, leading Sava Petrović Njegoš to beg the providur for his release. Sava stayed with him when he went to visit that area, and he characterizes the attributed guilt as slander of his evildoers.

== Sources ==
- Стојковић, Славо (2009). "Браћа Тројановићи" [The Troyanović Brothers] (PDF). Slovo: Journal of Serbian Language, Literature and Culture. 23: 196–212. Archived from the original (PDF) on 2014-07-24.
- Тоља, Никола (2011). Дубровачки Срби католици, истине и заблуде. Дубровник.
