= Rafael Pucić =

Croatian politician (1828–1890)

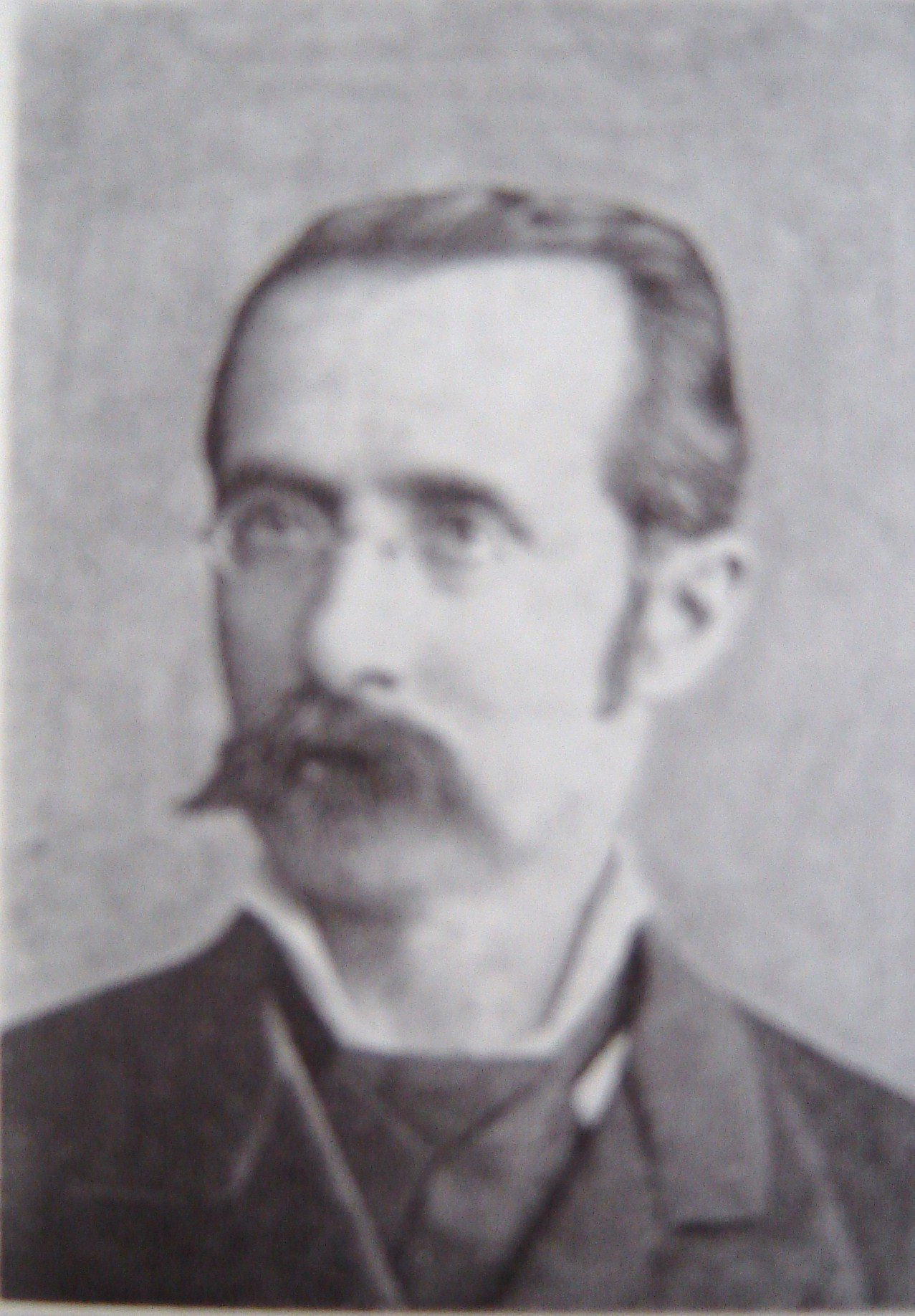

Mayor of Dubrovnik
- In office 1869–1878
- Preceded by: Vice Vuletić
- Succeeded by: Pero Čingrija
- In office 1882–1886
- Preceded by: Pero Čingrija
- Succeeded by: Vlaho de Giulli

Personal details
- Born: 27 April 1828 Dubrovnik
- Died: 11 April 1890 (aged 61) Vienna
- Occupation: Politician

Rafael Pucić (27 April 1828 – 4 November 1890) was a lawyer and politician from Dubrovnik. He was a member of the Austrian Imperial Council and served as mayor of Dubrovnik.
