= Vicko Adamović =

Writer and historian from Dubrovnik (1838–1919)

Vice or Vicko Adamović (Serbian Cyrillic: Вицко Адамовић; 1838 – 9 January 1919) was a pedagogue and historian from Dubrovnik.

A native of Dubrovnik, Adamović studied natural science in Vienna. He researched the archives of Dubrovnik and wrote many monographs about Župa, Gruž and Rijeka Dubrovačka. Vicko was a contributing writer in journals Slovinac, Bratstvo, Dubrovnik, and Srđ as well as Italian publications. In 1889 he founded the Provincial School Museum in Dubrovnik.

Adamović was among the leaders of the Serb-Catholic movement in Dubrovnik.

He is best known for his comprehensive thesis on earthquakes in which he systematically studied earthquakes from Dubrovnik's past.

Vicko is the father of Lujo Adamović (1864–1935), a well-known Serbian botanist.

== Sources ==
- Lukežić, Irvin (August 2008). "Nobleman Nikša Gradić, Lawyer and Writer (1825–1894)". Anali Zavoda za Povijesne Znanosti Hrvatske Akademije Znanosti i Umjetnosti u Dubrovniku (46): 137–225. ISSN 1848-7815.
