= Petar Kolendić =

Petar Kolendić (Serbian Cyrillic: Петар Колендић; Dubrovnik, 17 September 1882 - Belgrade, 14 April 1969) was a Serbian and Croatian writer and literary historian.

He was mostly influenced by his professors -- Vatroslav Jagić, Konstantin Jireček, Václav Vondrák, and Milan Rešetar -- from the time he attended the universities in Zagreb, Berlin, Prague, and Belgrade. In academia, Kolendić acquired and assimilated a certain approach to the history of literature, to which he was to be faithful throughout his life.

In 1964, his writings were collected and printed in a book entitled "From the Ancient Dubrovnik", published by Belgrade's Srpsko književna zadruga. All of his essays deal with the literary and cultural past of the Serbian and Croatian people, from earliest, to the medieval, renaissance and baroque periods in Dubrovnik, Dalmatia, Slavonia, and Bosnia to the first half of the 19th century and the advent of Njegoš.

== Honours ==
- Member of the Serbian Academy of Sciences and Arts. 2 March 1946

== See also ==
- Sava Bjelanović
- Frano Kulišić
