= Pero Čingrija =

Croatian politician (1837–1921)

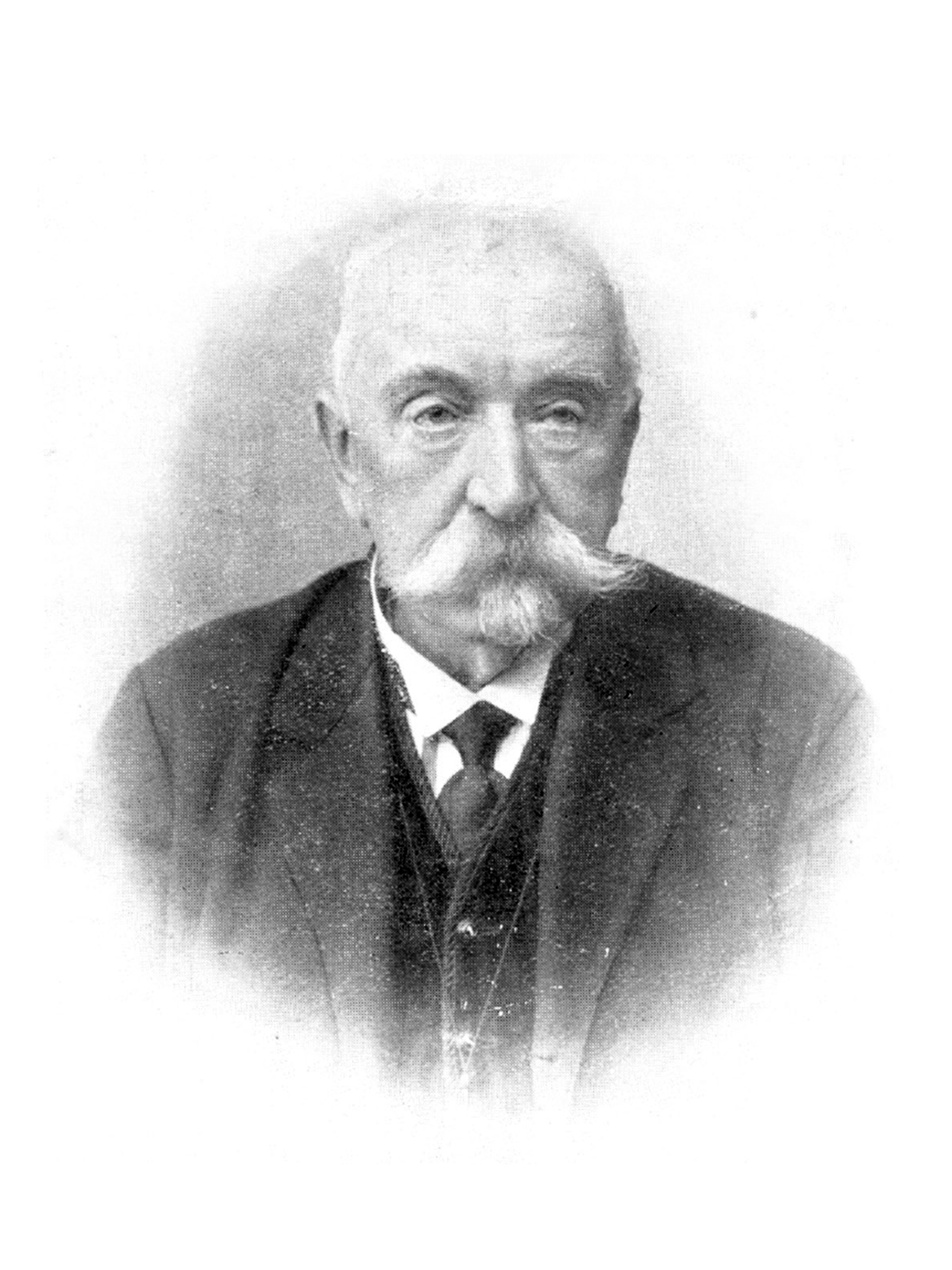

Mayor of Dubrovnik
- In office 1878–1882
- Preceded by: Rafael Pucić
- Succeeded by: Rafael Pucić
- In office 1899–1911
- Preceded by: Frano Getaldić-Gundulić
- Succeeded by: Melko Čingrija

Personal details
- Born: 24 August 1837 Dubrovnik, Kingdom of Dalmatia, Austrian Empire
- Died: 13 July 1921 (aged 83) Dubrovnik, Kingdom of Serbs, Croats and Slovenes
- Relatives: Melko Čingrija (son)
- Occupation: Politician

Pero Čingrija (24 August 1837 – 13 July 1921) was a Croatian politician. As a long-time mayor of Dubrovnik and leader of the People's Party, he was one of the most prominent Dubrovnik and Dalmatian politicians at the turn of the 20th century.

== Biography ==
Čingrija was born in Dubrovnik. He was highly esteemed as a civic intellectual, a lawyer, and member and leader of the People's Party.

He was first elected into the Diet of Dalmatia in 1870, and continued to be elected until 1918. He was the mayor of Dubrovnik from 1878 to 1882, and continuously from 1899 to 1911. He was the longest-serving mayor in Dubrovnik's history.

After the deaths of Miho Klaić (1896) and Gajo Bulat (1900), he became the leader of the People's Party at the level of Dalmatia. He advocated for the cooperation of Dubrovnik populists and moderate right-wingers. He transferred the fruits of Dubrovnik's cooperation to the level of Dalmatia when, on April 26, 1905, it was through his efforts that Dalmatian populists and moderate rightists merged into the Croatian Party, of which he immediately became president.

He was one of the founders of the New Course Policy, which proposed cooperation between Serbs and Croats against Austria-Hungary. As president of the Croatian Club in the Dalmatian Parliament in early October 1905, he chaired a conference in Rijeka at which the Rijeka Resolution was adopted, marking the victory of the new course policy, and then a member of the Croatian committee to negotiate with the Hungarian opposition on the implementation of the Rijeka resolution.

When the pro-Austrian mood prevailed in the leadership of the Dalmatian Croatian Party, and when the austrophile Vicko Mihaljević was elected its president on September 14, 1908, under Čingrija's influence, representatives from Dubrovnik and Korčula resigned. On September 20, in Dubrovnik, the Independent Organization of the Croatian Party was founded and headed by Čingrija. In 1910 he returned to the Croatian Party when they replaced their leader with Niko Duboković.

Pero Čingrija was one of four representatives of the People's Party that the Kingdom of Dalmatia elected in the 1911 Imperial Austrian elections.

The collapse of the Habsburg Monarchy and dissolution of Austria-Hungary following World War I was welcomed by Čingrija. Although he advocated the creation of a Yugoslav state, he soon became disillusioned with its organization and the relations that prevailed in it.

His son Melko was also a politician.

Political offices
| Preceded by Rafael Pucić | Mayor of Dubrovnik; 1878–1882 | Succeeded by Rafael Pucić |
| Preceded by Frano Getaldić-Gundulić | Mayor of Dubrovnik; 1899–1911 | Succeeded by Melko Čingrija |
