= Božidar Petranović =

Serbian politician, historian and lawyer

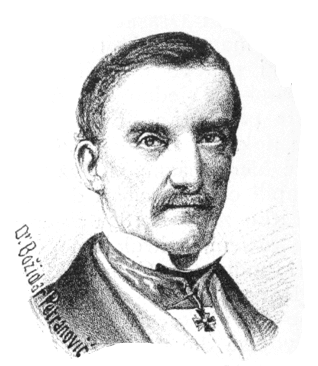
- Born: 18 February 1809; Šibenik, Dalmatia
- Died: 12 September 1874 (aged 65); Venice, Italy
- Education: Gymnasium of Karlovci
- Occupations: author, historian
- Known for: founder and publisher of "Serbian-Dalmatian Magazine"

Božidar Petranović (18 February 1809 – 12 September 1874) was a Serbian author, scholar, journalist, and one of the leading historians of Serbian literature and a distinctive proponent of world literature. He is also mentioned as Theodor (Greek version of Serbian Božidar) Petranović in some publications. He is regarded as one of the early Serbian bibliographers.

== Biography ==
Born in Šibenik, Dalmatia, Božidar Petranović was one of the first Dalmatian Serbs to be educated in the newly constructed Metropolitanate of Karlovci's Gymnasium of Karlovci. He was also educated in Graz together with Ljudevit Gaj.

Božidar Petranović was the founder and publisher of the first Serb academic and scientific paper in Zadar, entitled the "Serbian-Dalmatian Magazine" (Srbsko-dalmatinski magazin). In 1838, Petranović claimed that the greater part of the population of the Kingdom of Dalmatia was "of Serb name" and spoke "true Serbian dialect". He later hired the Dubrovnik Eastern Orthodox priest Georgije Nikolajević as an editor of Magazin, and the two promulgated Ljudevit Gaj-Vuk Karadžić's language reforms. He also corresponded with authors Niccolò Tommaseo, Francesco Dall'Ongaro, journalist Pacifico Valussi (1813–1893), Ivan August Kaznačić (1817–1883), Medo Pucić, and Stipan Ivičević (1801–1871).

Throughout 1848–1849, Petranović argued that to secure a better economic future it was necessary to transfer Dalmatia into a commercial haven between sea and hinterland, between the Mediterranean and Balkan trade by lifting maritime custom taxes. In this pursuit, Petranović, along with Stipan Ivičević and Zora dalmatinska editor Ante Kuzmanić, tried to found a Dalmatian-Bosnian newspaper. Ivičević also sought to convince Habsburg authorities to set up a railroad line that connected Dalmatia directly to Mostar, Sarajevo, and Belgrade.

In 1838, he claimed Dubrovnik's literary tradition for Serbia since Dubrovnik's (also known as Ragusa of old) authors "wrote in Serbian, but with Latin letters." (Croats particularly members of the Catholic clergy were of the opposite opinion and so the dispute continues to this day). Similar theories were proposed by Vaso Glušac (1879–1955) at the beginning of the 20th century, and contemporary historian Dragoljub Dragojlović in his 1987 book.

Petranović died in Venice on 12 September 1874.

== Sources ==
- Jovan Skerlić, Istorija nove srpske književnosti (Belgrade, 1921), page 133.
