= Luko Zore =

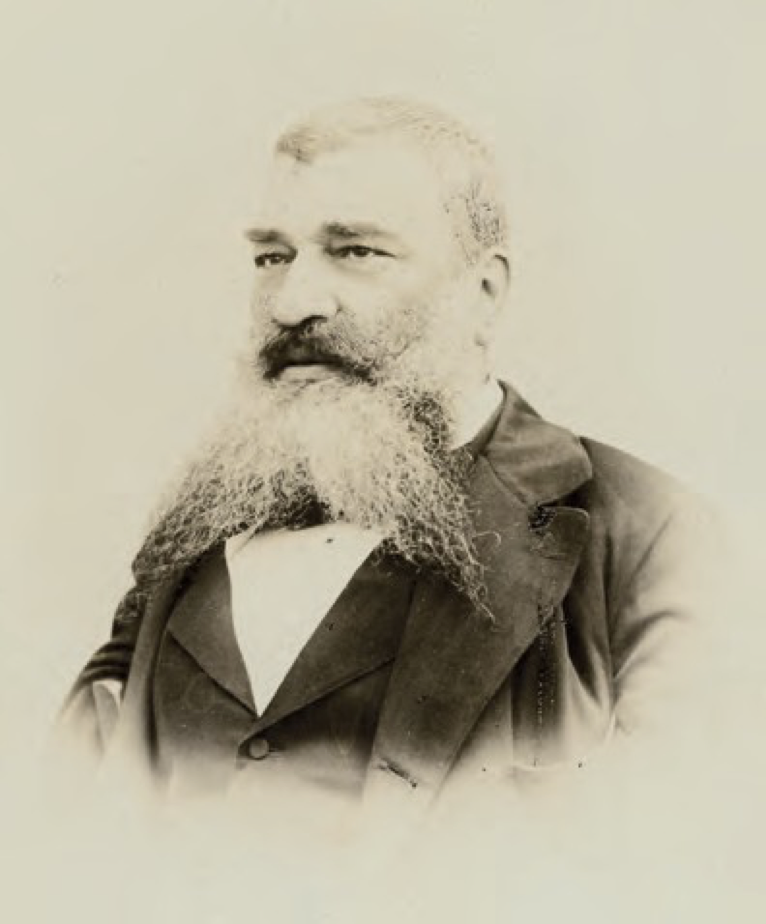
- Portrait of Luko Zorе
- Born: January 15, 1846; Cavtat, Kingdom of Dalmatia, Austrian Empire
- Died: November 26, 1906 (aged 60); Cetinje, Kingdom of Montenegro
- Occupations: philologist and writer
- Writing career
- Notable work: Dubrovčani su Srbi
- Movements: Serb-Catholics, Yugoslav

Luko Zore (Serbian Cyrillic: Луко Зоре; January 15, 1846 – November 26, 1906) was a philologist and Slavist from Dubrovnik. He was one of the leaders of the opposition to Austro-Hungarian Empire and Italy in Dubrovnik and a member of the Serb Catholic movement in Dubrovnik. Later in life he lived in Montenegro.

== Biography ==
Luko Zore was born in Cavtat on 15 January 1846, as the son of Antun Zore and Marija Sabadin Pupiza. He finished elementary school in his hometown, completed high school in Dubrovnik before going to Vienna where he studied classical philology and Slavic studies.

After returning to Dubrovnik, he worked as a high school teacher and in 1878 became one of the initiators of the literary journal Slovinac, where he published discussions and poems. He was also its editor before its discontinuation in 1884.

From 1879 to 1880, he worked as a school counselor in the Bosnia and Herzegovina Land's Government, as district school supervisor in Dubrovnik from 1890 to 1895 and as manager of the men's prep school in Arbanasi near Zadar from 1895 to 1897. In 1902, he co-founded the journal Srđ with Antun Fabris and was also its editor. There, he published his first dramatic piece, Pokora, a bold attempt at challenging the capricious Thalia (Muse), the muse of comedy. The play—a farce—is set in Cavtat, Zore's birthplace, in the nineteenth century.

He published his song Objavljenje under the pseudonym Milivoj Strahinić.

At that time there were two major intellectual trends in Dubrovnik as well as in the whole of Dalmatia: one favoured the union of all the Slavic peoples, believing that they were of one nation (Illyrian movement), which was most prevalent in Dubrovnik. Luko Zore was active in Slavic associations, trying to fight the foreign political power and attempted to develop the idea of a national identity of the language and Slavic origins. He published a series of discussions in the field of philology and literary history in school annual reports, in various magazines and journals such as Rad JAZU, Spomenica SAN and Srđ.

His good friends and colleagues Risto Kovačić and the Pucić brothers (Niko Pucić and Medo Pucić) encouraged Luko Zore to enter politics as their representative in the Dalmatinski sabor (Diet of Dalmatia). He was elected in 1883.

A year later, on 30 January 1884, he became a member of the Serbian Learned Society, Srpsko učeno društvo, and corresponding member of the Serbian Royal Academy, better known as Srpske kraljevske akademije, on 4 February 1899. He was also a corresponding members of the Croatian Academy of Arts and Sciences.

In 1902, he allowed a controversial poem entitled "Bokeška noć" (Boccan night) by Uroš Trojanović to be published in Srđ, which got him immediately into trouble with the Austrian authorities. He was interrogated and incarcerated for two months, along with others but released in time for Christmas 1902. That same year, he became director of the grammar school in Kotor, as well as in Cetinje, where he was invited by the Montenegrin prince Nikola to be an educator for his son. Srđ as a review continued for another two years after Zore's death, but in 1908 it was discontinued. Zore's daughter Amalija (1875–1957) married marquis Luko de Bona (1863–1940).

Zore died in Cetinje, Montenegro in 1906. He was later re-buried in Dubrovnik's Cemetery Boninovo.

== Works ==
- Dubrovnikers are Serbs (Dubrovčani su Srbi), 1903, Dubrovnik.
- "Pokora", a farce written in Dubrovnik in 1905.
- "Naš jezik tijekom naše književnosti u Dubrovniku" (Our language in the course of our literature in Ragusa), Dubrovnik, 1871.
