= Melko Čingrija =

Croatian politician

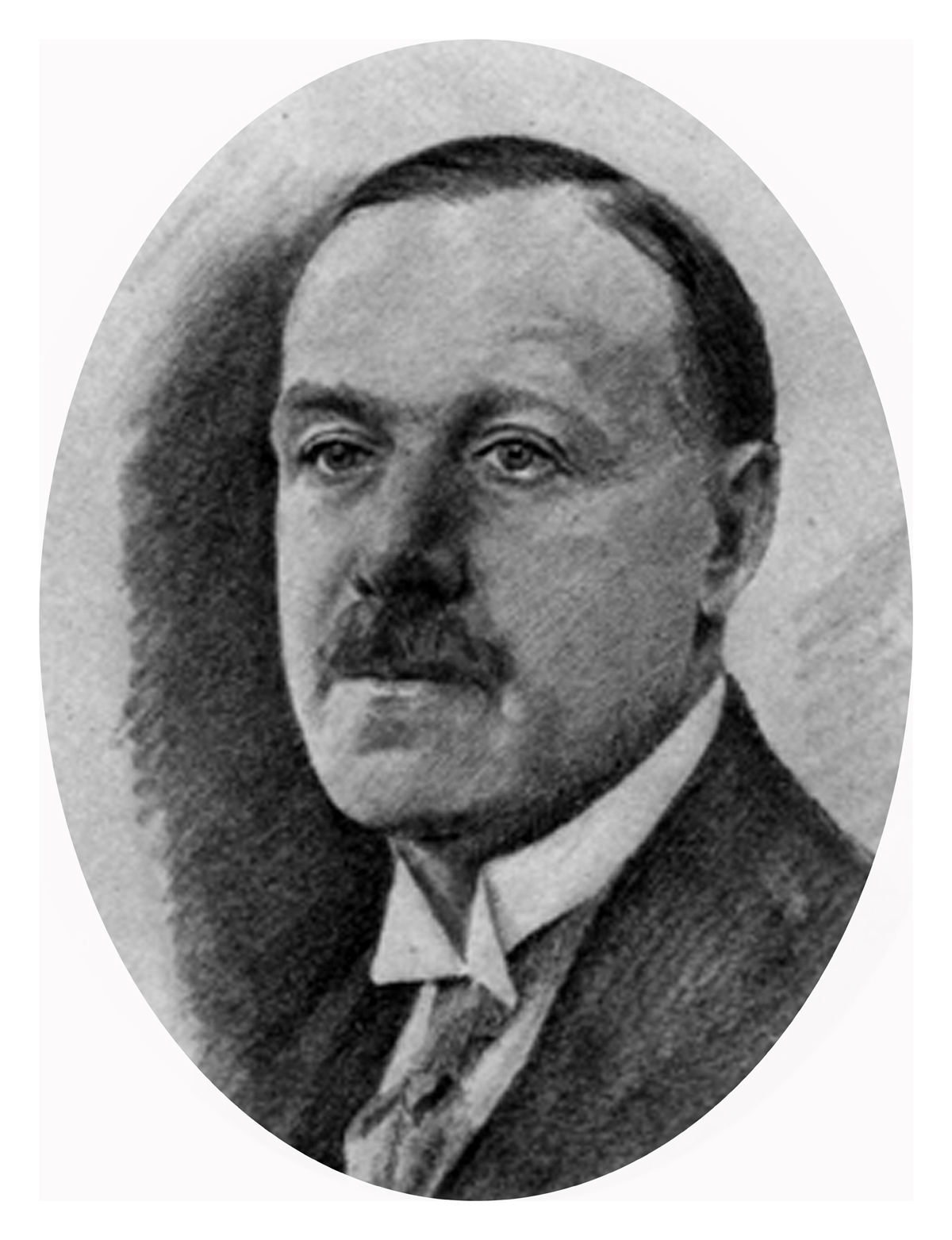

Deputy Governor of the National Bank of Yugoslavia
- In office 1934–1935
- Preceded by: Ignjat J. Bajloni
- Succeeded by: Milan Radosavljević

Mayor of Dubrovnik
- In office 1911–1914
- Preceded by: Pero Čingrija
- Succeeded by: Ivo Celio-Cega

Mayor of Dubrovnik
- In office 1919–1920
- Preceded by: Pero Čingrija
- Succeeded by: Ottomar Nonveiller

Personal details
- Born: 1 April 1873 Dubrovnik, Kingdom of Dalmatia, Austria-Hungary
- Died: 8 December 1949 (aged 76) Dubrovnik, PR Croatia, FPR Yugoslavia
- Parent: Pero Čingrija (father)
- Occupation: politician

Melko Čingrija (1 April 1873 – 8 December 1949) was a Yugoslav politician.

== Life and career ==
Čingrija completed his high school education in Dubrovnik before studying Law in Vienna and Zagreb and receiving a doctorate in Graz. He was the son of the long-time Dubrovnik mayor, Pero Čingrija.

Until 1905, he was a member of the People's Party, then of the Croatian Party. From 1903–08, he served as a member of the Dalmatian Parliament.

Čingrija was at the forefront of the struggle for Croatian national and political rights as one of the advocates of the New Course Policy. He was one of the signatories of the Rijeka resolution that led to the Croat-Serb Coalition. He twice served as the mayor of Dubrovnik (1911–14 and 1919–20).

At the beginning of the First World War, he was interned by the Austrian authorities for his opposition to the Austrian regime. When the Imperial Council was convened in May 1917, he was granted leave to perform parliamentary duties in Vienna. He signed the May Declaration of the Yugoslav Club in the Imperial Council (May 30, 1917) and the Geneva Declaration (November 9, 1918) on the creation of joint Yugoslav governments, of which he was a member.

In 1920, he turned to the Serbian-centric policy pursued by King Aleksandar Karađorđević and the Prime Minister of the Kingdom of Serbs, Croats and Slovenes, the Serbian radical Nikola Pašić. In 1926, he formally became a member of Pasic's Serbian People's Radical Party. In addition, Čingrija was the Deputy Governor of the National Bank of Yugoslavia, and he signed the banknotes in Cyrillic.

In 1939, he published the books Dubrovnik and The Croatian Question, in which he advocated for the Serb-Catholic point of view, beauty in the territorial division and that it was not necessary to establish the Banovina of Croatia over Zeta Banovina.

Political offices
Preceded by Pero Čingrija	Mayor of Dubrovnik; 1911–1914	Succeeded by Ivo Celio-Cega
Preceded by Pero Čingrija	Mayor of Dubrovnik; 1919–1920	Succeeded by Ottomar Nonveiller
