= Dubrovnik Prayer Book =

1512 Ragusan prayer book in Cyrillic

The Dubrovnik Prayer Book (Serbo-Croatian: Дубровачки молитвеник, Dubrovački molitvenik) is "liber horarum" type of prayer book. This type of prayer book was the most popular religious book for the laity until the beginning of 17th century. The prayer book was printed in August 1512, in Venice. It is printed in Cyrillic. The book was first revealed to the public in modern times in 1932.

== History ==
In 1512 Frančesko Micalović printed two Catholic prayer books in Venice, in the printing house of Giorgio Rusconi (Zorzi Ruskoni) of Venice. One of them being Dubrovnik Prayer Book (Officio Sanctae Brigittae).

On 18 September 1512, immediately after his return to Ragusa, Micalović stated that two cases of Slavic books belonged to Đuro, father of Petar Šušić.

== Language and script ==
Both books were printed by Micalović in Cyrillic script, classified by Zimmer as Bosnian Cyrillic, in Shtokavian dialect after being translated from Chakavian. In the contract signed by Micalović, the language of the prayer book was referred to as in littera et idiomate serviano 'in Serbian letters and language', Milan Rešetar made an analysis of script, content, spelling, and language, and concluded that "the Cyrillic alphabet which is used in the manuscript was not intended for the Orthodox Church or the Orthodox faith, Cyrillic alphabet which is part of that manuscript was regularly used by our Catholics and Muslims".

The four-part icon from church in the Orthodox Monastery of Virgin Mary's Birth in village of Sogle, (near Veles, North Macedonia) have decorative elements painted under influence of Cyrillic Prayer Book printed by Micalović. According to Dejan Medaković, renaissance decorative elements of this 16th-century icon are directly copied from Prayer Book printed by Micalović.

== Controversy ==
In his reissue in 1938, Rešetar thought this was a historical and literary monument that was especially valuable because it revealed the Slavic culture in Dubrovnik as Serbian, though intended for Catholics. It is sometimes considered first book printed in the Serbian vernacular (Italian: in littera et idiomate serviano), the earlier publications of the Crnojević printing house having been in Church Slavonic.

However, the language and faith have both caused controversy in recent times. For example, in 2012 the Croatian Academy of Sciences and Arts (HAZU) held a conference on the 500th anniversary of the book's publication under the name "Croatian Cyrillic Heritage" (Serbo-Croatian: Hrvatska ćirilska baština), with the Dubrovnik Prayer Book as a central topic. This sparked controversy and rejection with Serbian academics, most of whom disagreed with these classifications and stated that it constitutes cultural appropriation.

== Bibliography ==
- Ђорђић, Петар (1971). Историја српске ћирилице: Палеографско-филолошки прикази (in Serbian). Belgrade: Institute for Publishing Textbooks of the Socialist Republic of Serbia.
- Грковић-Мејџор, Јасмина; Савић, Виктор (2016). Српски Молитвеник: Споменица Милану Решетару 1512–1942–2012 (in Serbian). Belgrade: Serbian Academy of Sciences and Arts. ISBN 978-86-7025-717-7.
- Zimmer, Szczepan Karol (1 January 1983). The Beginning of Cyrillic Printing in Crakow, 1491: From the Orthodox Past in Poland. Social Science Monographs. ISBN 978-0-88033-027-5.
- Lazić, Miroslav A. (2018). "Venice and Editions of Early Serbian Printed Books". Thesaurismata. 48: 161–192.
- Novak, Viktor (1951). Istoriski časopis.
- Nazor, Anica (2014). "Hrvatski ćirilički molitvenik iz 1512. godine" [The Croatian Cyrillic prayer book of 1512]. Filologija. 62. Zavod za lingvistička istraživanja, Croatian Academy of Sciences and Arts: 17–31. ISSN 1848-8919.
- Maštrović, Tihomil (2005). Zbornik o Milanu Rešetaru: književnom kritičaru i filologu : zbornik radova s Međunarodnoga znanstvenog skupa : Beč 25. rujna 2004, Dubrovnik, 1.-2. listopada 2004. Hrvatski studiji Sveučilišta. ISBN 978-953-6882-57-1.
- Rešetar, Milan (1938). "Srpski molitvenik od g. 1512". Filosofski i filološki spisi (in Serbian). 32. Srpska kraljevska akademija.
- Tanasić, Sreto Z. (2023). "The Cyrillic and Serbian culture". Napredak - časopis za političku teoriju i praksu. 4 (2): 19–38. doi:10.5937/napredak4-45351. ISSN 2683-6106.
