= Pero Budmani =

Croatian Serb writer, linguist, grammarian

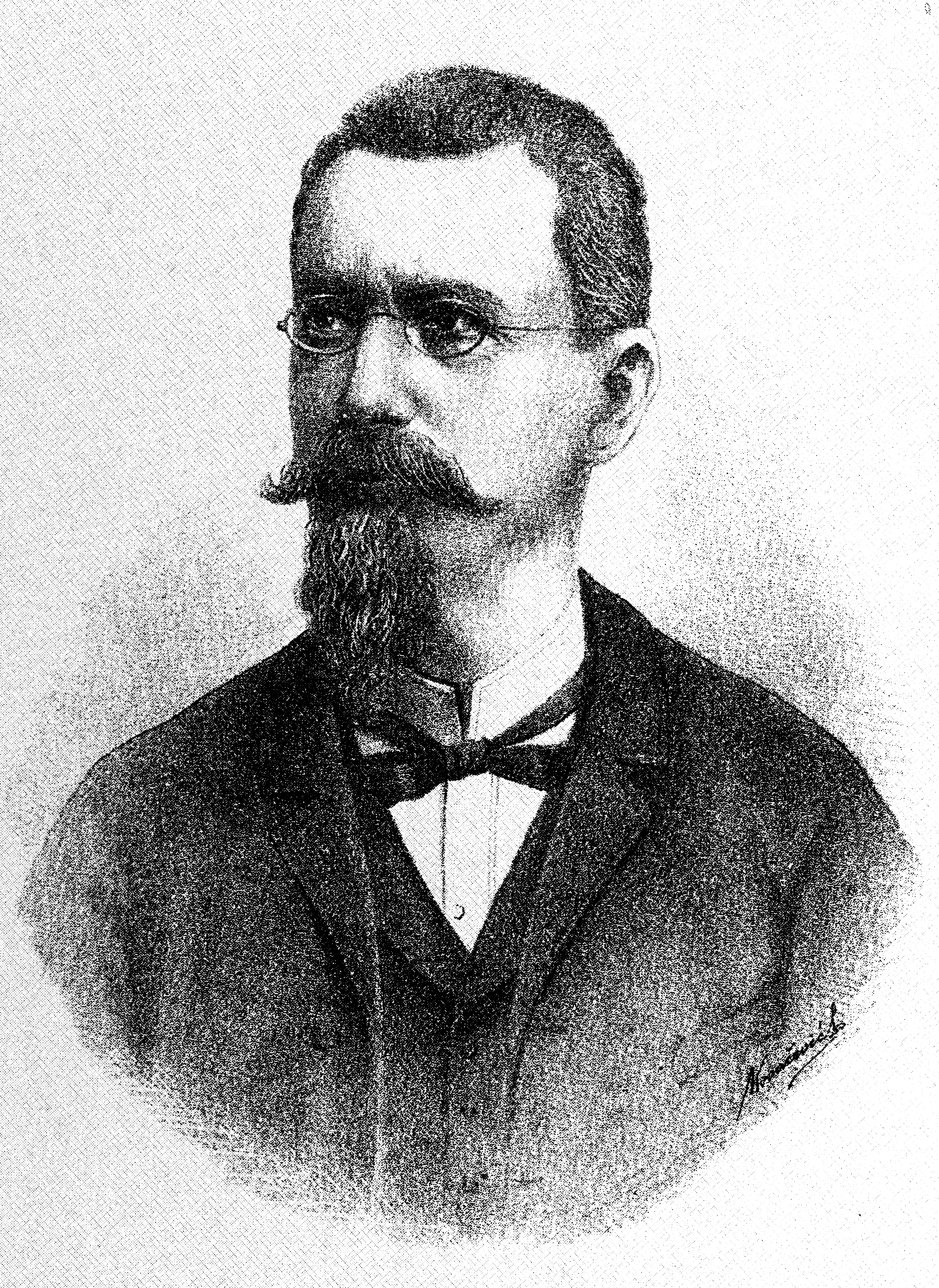
- Born: Petar Budmani; October 27, 1835; Dubrovnik, Kingdom of Dalmatia, Austrian Empire (now Dubrovnik, Croatia)
- Died: December 27, 1914 (aged 79); Castelferretti, Ancona, Kingdom of Italy (now Castelferretti, Italy)
- Occupations: linguist, philologist
- Writing career
- Notable work: Grammatica della lingua serbo-croata (illirica) (1867)

Pero Budmani (Serbian Cyrillic: Перо Будмани, pronounced [pěːro bǔdmaːni]; 27 October 1835 – 27 December 1914) was a Croatian Serb writer, linguist, grammarian, and philologist from Dubrovnik and a renowned polyglot.

== Biography ==
Budmani was born in Dubrovnik/Ragusa, at the time part of the Austrian Empire's Kingdom of Dalmatia. He completed gymnasium in Dubrovnik and then after 1853 moved to Vienna to study medicine, then switched to law, but did not complete his studies, and would travel to his uncle's estate near Ancona where he was exposed to the ideas of the Risorgimento. In 1861 he got married and moved back to Dubrovnik. He became one of the prominent members of the Serb-Catholic movement in Dubrovnik.

Budmani wrote a seminal book in Italian called Grammatica della lingua serbo-croata (illirica) that described the Serbo-Croatian grammar, published in Vienna in 1867. Because it was written primarily as a manual for use in the gymnasia in Dalmatia, it was restricted in scope and space, but it soon received high praise from Đuro Daničić in Rad JAZU #2 in 1868. Budmani's description of the limited use of aorist and imperfect and the subtleties of perfect was consistent with Croatian vernacular at the time. The title included the term "Serbo-Croatian" in the title, with Illyrian in parentheses, making Budmani the first to have used the combined term Serbo-Croatian for Croatian and Serbian in a grammar book title.

In 1868, he started teaching at the Dubrovnik Gymnasium. In 1870 he was first elected as a member of the People's Party to the Diet of Dalmatia. He was also elected to the Imperial Council twice, but renounced the position in Vienna in 1873. In 1876 he did the same in the Diet of Dalmatia.

In 1880, Budmani was among the esteemed intellectuals that the Municipal Council of Dubrovnik had oversee the construction of a monument dedicated to Ivan Gundulić, at the time planned for 1888.

In 1883, Budmani moved to Zagreb (at the time part of Kingdom of Croatia-Slavonia) and became the editor of the Rječnik (Dictionary) of the Yugoslav Academy of Sciences and Arts (following the death of Đuro Daničić). He left the Gundulić monument oversight committee to focus on his work for the Academy's Dictionary before the end of the decade (the grand unveiling of the Gundulić monument only took place later, in 1893).

In 1888 he also became a corresponding member of the Serbian Learned Society and the Serbian Royal Academy, and in 1889 he became one for the Russian Academy of Sciences. He remained the editor of the Dictionary until 1907.

In 1907, he returned to the Castelferretti estate near Ancona, and lived there until 1913, when he returned to his native Dubrovnik. But already the following year, seriously ill and embittered for the persecution suffered at the hands of the Austrian police (who considered him a dangerous subversive), Pero Budmani fled from home, reached Ancona and died there on December 27, 1914.

Budmani spoke most of the European languages, including Old Slavonic, Greek, Latin, and several Asiatic languages.

Robert D. Greenberg, Associate Professor Department of Slavic Languages and Literatures, describes him as a Croat linguist.
