= Ivan Stojanović =

Roman Catholic priest

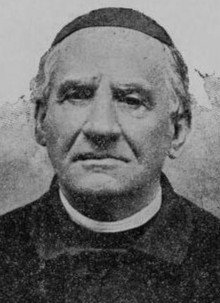
- Born: 17 December 1829; Dubrovnik
- Died: December 1900 (aged 70–71); Dubrovnik, Austria-Hungary
- Occupations: catholic priest, writer
- Writing career
- Notable work: Dubrovačka literature
- Literary movement: Serb-Catholics

Ivan Stojanović (17 December 1829 – December 1900) was a Catholic priest from Dubrovnik. He wrote the book Dubrovačka Književnost, published in 1900, arguing that the people of Dubrovnik were Roman Catholic by religion, but by language Serbs. He was involved with the literary journal Slovinac.

== Early life ==
Ivan "Ivo" Stojanović was born in Dubrovnik on 17 December 1829. He studied in Dubrovnik and Zadar. At an early age he decided to take orders, becoming a priest upon his graduation from the Zadar Roman Catholic Seminary in 1852. He spent a year in Korčula as a parish priest. After that he went to Rijeka where he spent thirty years.

In his lifetime he befriended many politicians and men of letters, including Vlaho Getaldić, Luka Diego Sorkočević (grandson of the Dubrovnik composer) and Jozo Bunić. An admirer of Dositej Obradović, Stojanović was one of the leading members of the group of intellectuals who formed the Serb-Catholic Circle of Dubrovnik. The chief dialogue of this movement, fostering inclusiveness for Italians and Serbs, was Dom Ivo Stojanović.

== Career ==
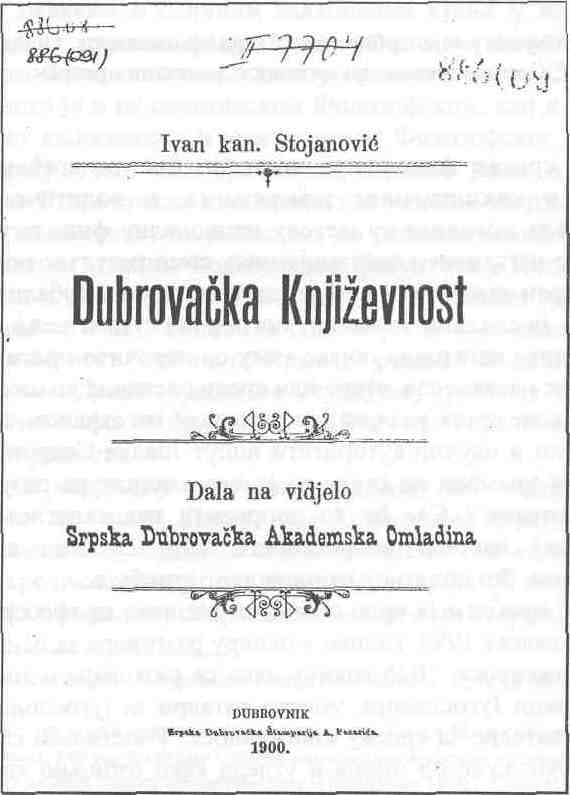
Dubrovačka Književnost (1900)

His reputation rests on his Dubrovačka Književnost (History of Literature in Dubrovnik), published in 1900 by Srpska Dubrovačka Akademiska Omladina,. He wrote papers on various literary subjects, including the writings of St. Augustine, Aristophanes ("The Clouds"), Petronius, Gotthold Ephraim Lessing, Friedrich Schiller, Voltaire, Denis Diderot ("Rameau's Nephew"), Paul Louis Courier, Petar II Petrović Njegoš, and Edmondo De Amicis, his contemporary.

Stojanović translated a German historical book Geschichte des Freystaates Ragusa by Johann Christian Engel (1770–1814) into Serbian under the title of Najnovijie povjest Dubrovačke Republike (Current History of the Republic of Dubrovnik), published in Dubrovnik by Srpsko Dubrovačke Štamparije A. Pasarića, 1903.

As a priest, historian, and moralist, Stojanović divided his history of nineteenth-century Dubrovnik into three epochs: first, the fall and death of Dubrovnik; second, the state of that moral body after death; and the rise of Dubrovnik from the ashes. Dubrovnik had been in decline even before 1808, due above all to the lessening of its role as intermediary in Balkan and Levantine trade, and to its shrinking merchant fleet in the Mediterranean.

Stojanović acted in the spirit of Vuk Karadžić, who is commonly called the father of modern Serbian culture.

== Sources ==
- Stojanović, Ivan (1900). Dubrovačka književnost. Srpska dubrovačka akademska omladina.
