= Mogorović family =

Mogorović
- Croatian & Hungarian noble family
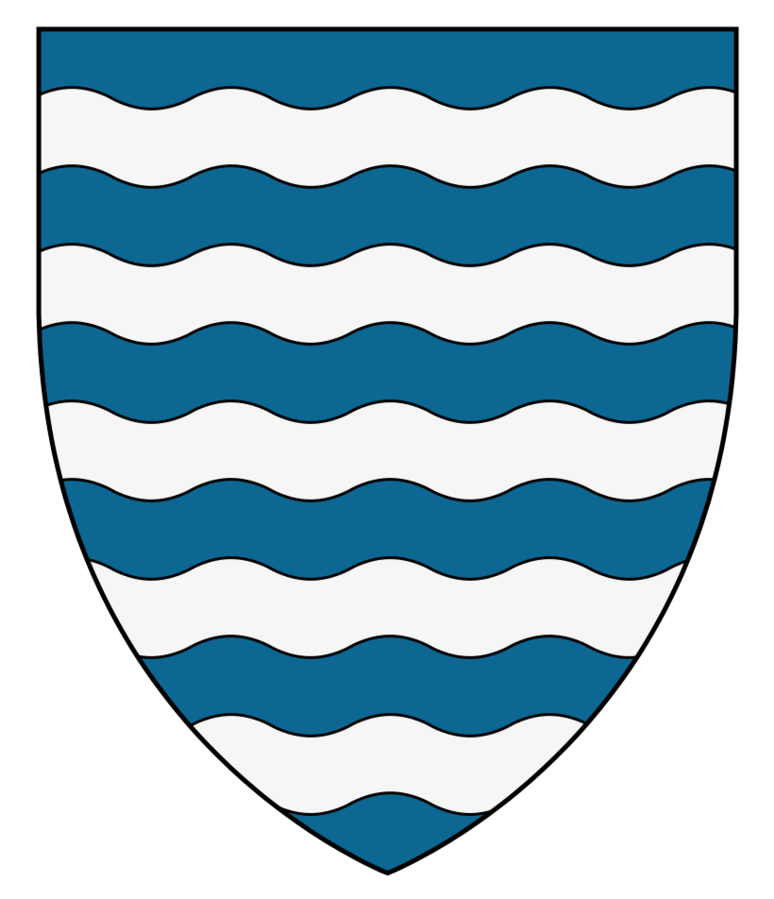
- Ancient coat of arms
- Country: Vassal to Kingdom of Croatia (1102–1526); Vassal to Kingdom of Hungary (1102–1526)
- Etymology: Mogor (Croatian): "Hermagoras"
- Founded: 11th century
- Titles: Župan, Knez, Comes, Count
- Traditions: Roman Catholic
- Estate: List: Lika, Počitelj, Mogorić, Raduč, Brekovica
- Cadet branches: List: Tolimirović, Disislavić, Berislavić, Novaković, Mogorić, Kobasić, Nelković, Jurislavić-Sopković, Vučić-Račić, Gojčić, Babonosić, Petričević-Hreljac, Petričević-Horvat, Bukovački

The Mogorović family was one of the twelve noble tribes of the Kingdom of Croatia, mentioned in the Pacta conventa and Supetar Cartulary. They were initially mentioned in the 12th and 14th centuries in the hinterland of Biograd na Moru and Zadar in Dalmatia, and since the 13th century in the region of Lika, where they branched into most prominently Disislavić noble family, besides being divided into other fourteen noble branches by 15th and 16th century. As experienced warriors, they actively participated in the Croatian–Ottoman wars. Direct descendants of the tribe live even today in Croatia.

== Etymology ==
The family name Mogor(-ović) probably derives from a patronymic Mogor or Mohor, which is a Slavic variation of the name of St. Hermagoras of Aquileia. It means "of Mogor". From such a form besides surname Mogorović also derive common Croatian patronyms from Istria: Mohor, Mohorić, Mohorac, Mohorović, Mohorčić, and Mohorovičić. It would imply the name was baptized into Croatia through the influence of Patriarchate of Aquileia and the tribe lost its original name. According to other theories, which consider it is unlikely that a Slavic tribe lost its original name, it derives from legendary ancestor Magor of Hungarian tribe Megyer from which derives Hungarian ethnonym Magyar implying a Hungarian origin, possibly supported by Pope Gregory XI's letter in 1373 (nobili uiro Magor, comiti de Licha). Another derived it from White Croatian Mouchlo, one of the seven brothers and sisters who led the Croatian tribes during their migration to present-day Croatia according to De Administrando Imperio (10th century). As Greek scripture often replaced "l" and "r" as well "chi" with "g" and "k", and distorted names, the derivation would go Mouchlo > Mouchro > Mougro > Mogor. Vladimir Mažuranić refuted possible derivation from Ural–Altaic names Mogol and Mogul.

In the historical sources, the family name also comes in forms of Latin: Cithorum, de genere Murichorum, Mogorouici, Mogorouich, Mogorouig, Mogorouikius, nobiles Mogorovichii, Magor, of which Cithorum and Murithorum considered as mutual, a possible distortion, often transcribed as Murić, but considering other sources, they certainly relate to the Mogorović's tribe. The family name can be found in the toponym of Mogorić, a settlement with castle ruins founded by the tribe, and medieval toponym Mogorova Dubrava, located on the site of later fort Kličevica near Benkovac.

== Coat of Arms ==
The Mogorović's coat of arms can be followed since the 15th century with the seals which used noble members of the tribe. The main motif of the shield is silver bars representing the river, which were flat, transversal, or like the most, wavy. The number of bars is undefined, ranging from two up to seven, intermediate being four or five, possibly indicating rivers around which the tribe lived. The shield color according to the coat of arms of Petričević-Hreljac branch from 1590 was azure, while the Babonožić's branch coat of arms from 1622 which had a silver shield and azure bars is most probably wrongly interpreted because such coloring is against heraldry practice. It had only slight variations, rarely with an addition of a lion with a sabre (Mogorić), griffin (Babonožić), or six to eight-pointed star (Gojčić, Kobasić). The armor's helmet and its mantle are unknown.

== History ==
In the 11th and 14th century they are mentioned in the hinterland of Biograd na Moru and Zadar in Dalmatia, and since the 13th century in the župa of Lika. It is not clear whether they originated from župa Sidraga, Nona and Luka in Dalmatia, or from Lika. It is considered that the process of formation of a noble genus finished by the beginning of the 13th century and that probably all members had an unknown common ancestor. In Lika, besides having the title of župan also named as špan or knez, the tribe had its own noble court table (plemeniti stol), with additional four judges, and two court officials (pristav). It also had 24 local nobles (osidnici). Only when župan and all judges were gathered was full table (pun stol) to start a lawsuit, which happened during Monday. This privilege they kept until 16th century.

Through time they had inherited estates in Southeastern, Western, Central and Northeastern part of Lika. Their lands bordered in the North the Frankopan family, and reached to the South of Velebit up to Obrovac and Posedarje, where bordered Gusić tribe branches Kurjaković and Posedarski. They pushed out other noble families, like Tugomirić, Čudomirić and Lagodušić, being the most numerous tribe in the region. According to documents its members lived in settlements Bisići, Cahovići ili Cehovići, Crna vas, Dugošani, Gaćelezi, Grvozdnica, Kasezi, Kuklići, Lučani, Marinci, Podslun, Radina-vas, Ribnik, Sebidraža, Skurina, Stinice, Telić-selo, Vrhovljani, Zabrdo, Zahumići, Zažićno, and many others. The nobles built several forts, today all in ruins, in Lika and on slopes of the mountain Velebit, including Počitelj, Lička Ostrovica, Barlete, Lički Novi, Bilaj, Ribnik, Mogorić among others, which almost all have become property of Frankopan and Kurjaković families by early 16th century.

In Dalmatia, they founded the church of Sv. Gospe (St. Lady) in village Tukljača (today Turanj), mentioned as Tochinia in 1078 charter by Demetrius Zvonimir of Croatia. It is notable because it has built-in lintel which mentions it was founded by the tribal members Mogori cognations in honor of their ancestor Gregorius Mogor, son Olim Nicula Mogor, and due to its inscription content and another interwoven ornament can be dated to the 9th or the 10th century at the latest (according to some it dates itself to 845 and mentions Duke Mislav of Croatia). The tribe is recorded at least since the 1069, a royal document by King Petar Krešimir IV of Croatia in which founded female monastery of St. Toma in Biograd na Moru, when is mentioned terrara Mogorouici, with terram Mogorouizi mentioned again in 1164. The earliest supposedly known member of the genus is župan Petrum Murithorum, one of the twelve noblemen mentioned in Pacta conventa (1102) who negotiated with Coloman, King of Hungary. According to the Supetar Cartulary, they were one of six tribes which selected bans who, in turn, elected a new king in a case where the prior king died without leaving heirs, and possibly mentions Peter Mogorovig. In the late 12th century are recorded witnesses Gregorius (1188), Mergia (1197), while in the next line Disislavus, Duymo (1207), Joanni (1240), Berislavus, and Petrus. Joanni (Ivan) of Raduč (1240), was a royal knight and counselor of Béla IV of Hungary and received villages Regiane and Veterinići and Ljuba fortress with its estates in 1268. In 1248, the noble court in Lika confirmed that certain land Tethacsics has been owned since immemorial times by progenitors of certain Porugh who can use it with rights like of a noble class of Mogorović and that it bounded with terrae Mogorovich. In 1263, Petar Tolimirović from the Tolimirović branch received some estates as a replacement for fortified town Počitelj from the King Béla IV. In 1349, brothers Novak, Martinuš and Petar of Borislav, and Grgur of Tolimir, from the Tolimirović branch sold the majority of their estates for 3,000 Venetian lira to members Kurjak of Disislav, Novak, Grgur and Ivan of Petar of another noble branch Disislavić. Another branch, Berislavić, is mentioned between 1349 and 1411. In the 1360s their inherited title of župans of Lika was taken by King Louis I of Hungary, however in 1372 there was a reconciliation, and in 1373 letter by Pope Gregory XI, about confiscated church dozens of the Nin diocese so the Lika prefect was informed about it, are recorded župans Novak, Petar, and Magor or Mogor who also was from the Tolimirović branch or was a founder of the branch which later had a surname Mogorić.

In 1446, Ivan Jurislavić for his merits in service to Ivan and Grgur Kurjaković received Badučevo Selo in Lika. In 1468, Ivan Gusić from the tribe of Mogorović was gifted with some estates in Paprčane and Tršćane also for military service by Pavao Kurjaković, implying some members of the Gusić tribe became part of the Mogorović tribe. In the same year some members of Mogorović family from Srijan bought estates in same villages from Pavao Kurjaković, and to their brothers in 1478 were gifted some estates in area of Zadar by descendants of Karlo Kurjaković. In 1490 Glagolitic document is mentioned Tomaš Mogorić, who was špan of noble people in Bužani. Two years later, Tomaš with Ladislav Vučić and Pál Petričević, went to Budim to sign a document by which Croatian nobility guaranteed Maximilian I of the House of Habsburg inheritance to the Hungarian-Croatian throne if the king Vladislaus II of Hungary died without descendants. In 1551 census of the military crew of Senj were listed Petar, Vinko, and Matija Gojčić - Mogoroević de Novaki in Lika. The latter was buried in 1555 in the family tomb in the church of St. Franjo in Senj. It has a tombstone decorated with an inscription and a coat of arms. In 1675 or 1679 in the church at Marija Gorica near Zaprešić, Mihael Vrenić erected an epitaph to the captain of Ogulin, Martino Mogorich who died c. 1643, which is richly decorated, depicting him, an episode from a battle with Turks, his coat of arms, and an inscription. Almost the same coat of arms can be found in the seal of Nikola Mogorić from 1675. It is considered that this branch's male line got extinct at the end of the 17th century.

From the branch Budišić most prominent was Franko, mentioned between 1492 and 1506, who promoted writing of Glagolitic books, including Drugi novljanski brevijar by Martinac from Lapčan family. He was a representative and Prior of Pauline monastery and church of St. Mary in Zažićno (today Pazarište). After the devastating Battle of Krbava Field (1493), renewed monastery estates with grants from Mogorović and Frankopan family.

Several churches on the territory of today's Gospić in Lika were important to the tribe; the church of St. John in Kasezi, located probably in the center of Gospić, and mentioned since 1263. Between Počitelj and Kukljić was located the church of Sveti Ivan u Lici na Gori ("Saint John in Lika on the Hill", 1017 m.a.s.l.) which most probably was founded by the Mogorović's. The church had estates in Čelopeci, Kozji Rog, and Nadbrdo. In 1433, Vlachs who lived in its surroundings and Velebit officially promised they would not do any damages to it. In 1441, seemingly all Mogorović's, led by comes Franko Petričević, donated a Glagolitic missal and prescribed all income from župa's taxes to the church for the forgiveness of their sins and all dead souls. By the early 16th century there they also built a Franciscan monastery, which will be abandoned during Ottoman's conquest. In 1449, the Glagolitic missal was bought for 27 ducats by the church of St. Marija in village Drenovac, under the protection of comes Dujam IV Frankopan, to be bought back for 200 ducats. It likely was their votive church while St. John their patron saint. Another church was of St. Peter in Sutpetar, a town which was the center of the county, on an important commercial crossroad with a square for a trade fair.

By the end of the 15th and beginning of the 16th century, it is considered that it numbered up to 3,500 people, or 1,500 people with 300-350 houses. According to Vjekoslav Klaić, the families who were recorded between 1499-1515 and who descended from the tribe are: Babić, Babonožić, Bučić or Vučić, Budišić, Drašković, Dudulović, Gojčić, Gonešić, Hlapčić or Hlibčić, Jakovlić, Juričić, Jurislavić, Kobasić, Korlatović, Lalković, Lopušić, Lovrenčić, Malić, Mihalić, Milječić, Miserić, Mitarinić, Mogorić, Nelković, Orlovčić, Paladinić, Petričević (and Hreljac), Piričić, Plišković, Podknežinić, Požarić, Pribislavić, Radčić or Račić, Radmančić, Skoblić, Sladojević, Slavković, Slišković, Sopčić or Sobčić, Srepković, Starci, Sučić or Sudčić, Surotvić, Tomašić, Tvrtković, Utišenić, Vidović, Vitosavić, Zoranić, Zdralić or Ždralić, Zdrubači among others. Out of them, Drašković family probably did not descend from the tribe or was not related to tribe's Drašković family. These families jointly lived in Lika until 1526–1528, when under Ottoman Empire conquest many members fell as victims, deciding to emigrated throughout Croatia, partly to around rivers Korana and Kupa, as well over river Kupa in Zagreb County and so on.

== Disislavić branch ==
The branch, also known as Desislavić while in Latin documents as Disclavich, Disislavich and Dissisclauig, is named after its founder Disislav (died before 1334), while from the second half of the 14th century they also had an adjective "de Licha", as well as "de Ostrovica" after same-titled estate and castle in Lika. He had the title of župan of župa Lika like all his descendants until the end of the 14th century.

After the fall of Mladen II Šubić of Bribir in 1322, Disislav's son comes Petro de Licha (d. before 1349) with his cousins from Kurjaković family managed the coastal town of Scrissa (Karlobag). He was mentioned as a witness with brother and župan Kurjak in 1334, in 1345 his estates had some damage due to Hungarian-Venetian conflict, and a year later was an envoy of Kurjaković's for Nin. In 1349, branch members bought wide estates from the Tolimirović branch. In the same year, the great council of the city of Split chosen Kurjak as the city's knez, but trustees of King Louis I of Hungary did not confirm it.

In 1351, Louis I confirmed to Grgur, Ivan, and Novak their estates in Lika, and a year later gifted them even some others. All these estates, and which Novak received in 1377 in Odorjanska župa (Upper part of the river Zrmanja), the brothers divided between themselves in 1377. Nothing is known about the descendants of Grgur, those of Ivan specifically Ivanko, Petar, Jakov, and Grgur were mentioned only in 1420 when sold part of their estates and Lička Ostrovica to the Count of Krk, Nikola IV Frankopan, while those of Novak founded the Novaković branch. In the documents on the lands of Lička Ostrovica lived some Vlachs or Morlachs in 1405 and 1420.

=== Notable members ===
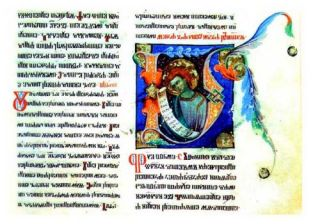
A page from Missal of duke Novak created by N. Disislavić in 1368.

- Novak Disislavić, a Croatian royal knight who wrote and illuminated the Glagolitic missal known as Missal of duke Novak from the 14th century.

== Babonožić branch ==
The branch, also known as Babonosić while in Latin documents as Babonosich and Babonossych, is named after its founder Baboneg. Until 1452 were mentioned in the hinterland of Zadar, while since the end of 15th and early 16th century in Donja Žažićna (today Donje Pazarište) in župa of Lika.

In 1457, Miklouš was a member of the noble court table of the Mogorović tribe. Among the signatories of Cetin charter (1527) and Croatian-Slavonian Sabor in Zagreb (1533) was Nikola. After the fall of Lika to Ottomans, the family members were vassals of Frankopan and Zrinski noble families, even settling on their estates. In 1545-1550 Ivan was castellan of Steničnjak which was Frankopan's estate, and 1556 as a judge during the division of property of Šubić's branch Peranski. Between 1548 and 1572 they were gifted with many estates including Skrad Castle (in pledge) by the Frankopan and Zrinski family due to military services. Pavle was captain of military troops of Juraj IV Zrinski, while Mihovil was captain of Ban's troops in 1581. In 1592, Gašpar was commander of the town Izačić. In the 17th century, as the vassals of Zrinski were mentioned Gabro (1620, 1629) and Baltazar (1638, 1642).

The known coat of arms is from seals by Juraj (1622) and Baltazar (1646), and one wood engraving from the 17th century that can be found on one altar of the church in the Svetice near Ozalj. In the church was a family crypt and at the end of the 19th century, it had a golden coat of arms. The family is not mentioned in the 18th century. Their relationship with Babonožić aliter Benvenuti from Zagreb County is unknown.

== Petričević branch ==
The branch's name is a patronym from Petar, where suffix "-ichevich" is a diminutive meaning "of Peter", probably named in honor of Petar from Pacta conventa (1102). Their seat was in Raduč. The earliest known progenitor is Joanni of Raduch (1240), whose great-grandson Jacobus (1401) was the first to be named "Petrichevich de Petrich".

A sub-branch of the family is Petričević-Hreljac, named after founder Hreljac son of Franko Petričević, written as Hrelac, Hrelacz, Hrelec, Hrelecz, Hreliacz, Hreliecz, Hrelijacs and Hrelyacz. The family was titled as aliter Petrichevich, Petricheuith or Petrichievich, and as they lived in Radina Vas (Raduč and Barlete) also had an adjective de Barlec et Radinavaz, de Barleth et Radinavacz, de Barleta et Radinavas, de Barletha et Radinauaz and de Radwch. In 1465, Hreljac bought some land in village Buchovichi in Lika from Karlo Kurjaković, and is mentioned among witnesses at the noble court table in 1487. His brother Petar is recorded 1495 for selling part of his estates to redeem a son from the Ottomans. Hreljac's son was also named Petar and was mentioned 1520 as a familiaris of Bernardin Frankopan. Family members extensively participated in the fights against the Ottomans and due to continuous pressure steadily migrated North of the river Kupa. Petar's son Juraj (d. before 1607) studied in Hungary, by 1576 was at the court of Ferdinand I and Maximilian I, then in the service of Juraj IV and Nikola V Zrinski, to whom was magister curiae and envoy. For many years he served military duties against the Ottomans along the Hungarian, Croatian and Slavonian border, and 1599 in Karlovac fortress. He married Barbara of Gašpar Mrnjavčić, getting an estate in the part of Brezovica, and until 1598 gathered some other estates. In December 1599, Rudolf II, Holy Roman Emperor confirmed the nobility status with a noble list and coat of arms issued in Plzeň to Juraj, his children Nikola, Vuk, Jelena, Margareta, Uršula, and brother Mihovil. Vuk was mentioned as the seigniory and owner of the estate in Brezovica (1614, 1629), and had a son Toma who was a noble judge in Varaždin County (1649–1663). Toma's son Franjo (d. 1709) with marriage received Pušća and in its region investigated peasant revolts. His son Baltazar (b. 1694) had six children and lived at Odranski Obrež where family descendants lived until the beginning of the 20th century.

Another prominent sub-branch was Hungarian family Petričević-Horvat, founded by Nikola Petričević of Raduč, later also joined by Kozma Petričević, who in the 1540s moved to Transylvania. It additionally branched into Horváth-Tholdy and Horváth-Inczédy family. The aristocratic members reached the rank of Baron, and were chiefs of the Unitarian Church of Transylvania, politicians, generals, professors, and academics. They built a manor house in Păsăreni, and a castle in Ilișua, Romania.

=== Notable members ===
- Boldizsár Petrichevich-Horváth (1714–1777), magistrate, chief of the Unitarian Church of Transylvania (1753–1777).
- Ferenc Petrichevich-Horváth (1731–1804), chief of the Unitarian Church (1778–1804).
- Kozma Petrichevich-Horváth (1735–1794), colonel knight of the Military Order of Maria Theresa, lieutenant general.
- Dániel Petrichevich-Horváth (1769–1842), major and patron.
- János Petrichevich-Horváth (1801–1874), lieutenant general.
- Albert Petrichevich-Horváth (1801–1874), interior secretary and general.
- Lászár Petrichevich-Horváth (1807–1851), writer and member of MTA.
- Ida Petrichevich-Horváth (1836–1877), poet
- Emil Petrichevich-Horváth (1881–1945), politician and professor.

== Kobasić branch ==
The branch is mentioned in Latin documents in the form Chobasich, Kobassich, Kobasich, Kobasych, Kobazich, Kobazych, Kopazyth, Khobassitsch, Khobassacsch, Kawaschitz, Klobatschutz. As had estates in surroundings of Bihać, including fortified town Brekovica, since 1496 had an adjective Brykowicza or Wrekhowicz. In 1488 were mentioned Matko and Jurko in regard to the successful defense of Obrovac against the Ottomans. In 1512, alongside Juraj Korlatović was mentioned Ivan Kobasić (d. 1531) as župan of Bužani, and a year later as royal castellan of Ostrovica Castle. For reporting movement of the Ottoman army and state in the Ottoman territory in 1519 was gifted with some estates in the surroundings of Bihać by King Louis II of Hungary. In 1524, he joined the service of Ferdinand I Habsburg, continuing his previous activities, and supported the Habsburg's inheritance to the throne at Cetin (1526–1527), accepting to have 15 horsemen out of 800 which will be maintained by the king. In the same year Ferdinand I gifted him town and seigniory of Žumberak, and estate near Bihać. To defend the estates in 1530 made peace with Ottoman commander in Livno. In 1523, Ivan and Gašpar built a family tomb with an inscription in the church of St. Antun (today Fethija Mosque) at Bihać. Ivan's son Juraj participated at the Battle of Mohács (1526), in 1540 was castellan of Kostajnica in service of Zrinski family. His son Gašpar was adopted by the widow of Nikola Bojničić, giving him estate Radotina near Mutnik, but the Ottomans army plundered it, taking 200 people and 2000 animals. In 1551, general Ivan Lenković suggested to the Habsburgs to help Gašpar because Brekovica was important in the defense against the Ottomans, but it would be abandoned and ruined in 1584. His son Ivan died in 1580, during the raid of Juraj IV Zrinski on Kaniža, as the last member of the family in Croatia. The relationship with Kobasić family in Lika (1499) and Kobasić von Schmidhoffen (1685) is unknown.

== Bukovački branch ==
A branch, also known in Latin documents as Bukouachi, Bukouachky, Bwkowachky, Wukowatzky, had a toponym adjective "of Bukovica" (de Bukoicza, Bwkowycza). During the 1570s, Ladislav (d. before 1610) was Vice-Ban and župan of Zagreb and Križevci County. In 1579, King Rudolf II confirmed the nobility status to him, his son Gabriel, brothers Juraj and Nikola and other cousins. The son Gabriel was noble judge (1604), then was magister lustrae haramiarum Colapianorum (1612–1615), and between 1621 and 1625 was Vice-Župan of Zagreb County. Possibly his brother, Ladislav, in 1642 was capitaneo et vaiuodae Berkiseuiensi. The last member of the branch was captain Franjo who was in the service of Petar Zrinski, and during the Magnate conspiracy negotiated with French's envoy and the Ottoman's Sultan Mehmed IV. He thought that succeeded in negotiations with the Ottomans in February 1670, and not knowing about the background plans of the Austrian royal court, started a local rebellion. After the collapse of the conspiracy escaped to Ottoman territory, and although was rapidly pardoned and estates returned by King Leopold I he did not come back nor left a descendant.

== See also ==
- Croatian nobility
- Twelve noble tribes of Croatia
- List of noble families of Croatia
