= Jamomet family =

One of the twelve noble tribes of the Kingdom of Croatia

Jamomet
- Croatian & Hungarian & Bosnian noble family
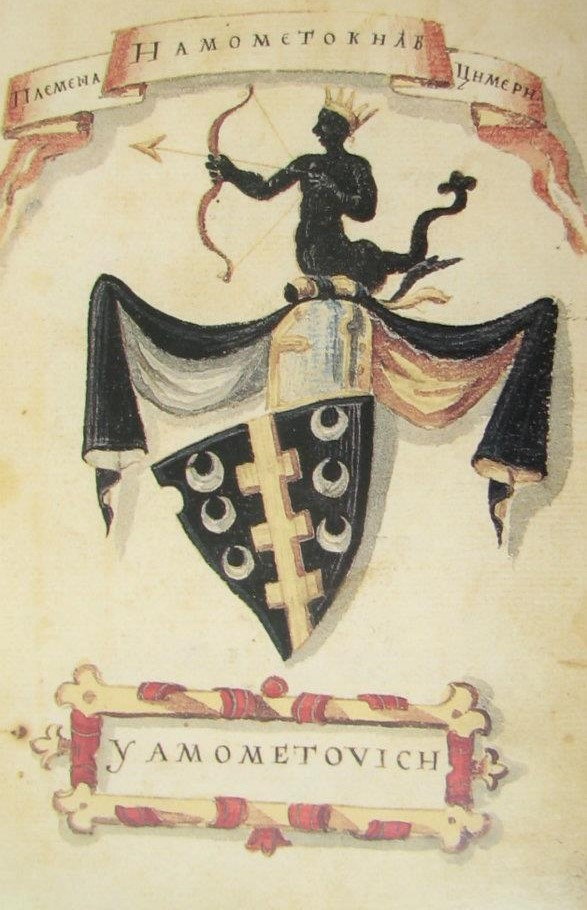
- Coat of arms from Korjenić-Neorić Armorial (1595)
- Country: Vassal to Kingdom of Croatia (1102–1526); Vassal to Kingdom of Hungary (1102–1526); Vassal to Kingdom of Bosnia (1333–1466)
- Founded: 12th century
- Titles: Župan, Knight, Voivode
- Traditions: Roman Catholic
- Cadet branches: List: Ančić, Mihaljević, Budčić, Pribišević, Kličković, Križanić, Novaković

The Jamomet family, also known as Jamometi, Jamometić or Jamometović, was one of the twelve noble tribes of the Kingdom of Croatia, mentioned in the Pacta conventa (1102). Originally from Dalmatia, in the 14th century the surname is also mentioned in Zachlumia, possibly being a branch of the Croatian tribe, but the relationship remains uncertain.

== Etymology ==
The families in the sources are also referred as Giamometorichi, Giamometovich, Iamomet, Jammomethi, Jamometich, Jamometigh, Yamometi, Yamometh, Jamomethorum.

== Coat of arms ==
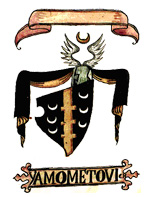
Jamometović's coat of arms from Fojnica Armorial, 17th century.

In the Korjenić-Neorić Armorial (1595), signed as Yamometovich, their coat of arms had a shield with black color, party per pale by a golden pale with three pieces on each side. In each part were three upward silver crescent Moons placed on the top of each other. On the helmet was a crowned black Triton who with the bow is shooting a golden arrow. The helmet's mantle is black-golden. It was again included in the Fojnica Armorial (17th century), but instead of a Triton, the helmet has a pair of white wings in the middle of which is a golden crescent Moon. The Sarak armorial (1746), signed as Xamometoevich, and Bojničić's Siebmachers Wappenbuch: Der Adel von Kroatien und Slavonien (1899), had the same style of the coat of arms like in Korjenić-Neorić armorial.

== Croatian family ==
Their original estates probably were located in the Northwestern and Central part of the Luka županija, specifically in Krbavac lug, Krneza, Magline, Podlužje, Rosulje, Menišić, and near Ostrovica. Earliest known member of the genus is župan Ioannem de genere Jamomet(ith)orum, one of the twelve noblemen mentioned in Pacta conventa (1102) who negotiated with Coloman, King of Hungary, but the document is rather considered a mid-14th century forgery. Nevertheless, it is considered that the family probably existed in the 12th century. First surely known members are witnesses Pripico et Dobrano Jamometi from 1240 in regard of a land lawsuit near Biograd na Moru. Until 1270, Mistihna earned some estates in Selci where had serfs, and probably lived in Zadar as a citizen, like Borislav (1303). In medieval Podlužje parish was located a 12th-13th century Romanesque church dedicated to St. George.

Since the end of the 13th century, some members permanently lived with the status of a noble citizen in the city of Nin. In 1284 is recorded Mojša son of Hranko, and the latter probably was the same-named citizen who owned saltworks at Pag in 1292. A contemporary prominent member of the family was Vučeta who served as the mayor of Nin (1284–1302) and Split (1304–1307). He was married to Jelena, sister of Ban Paul I Šubić of Bribir, and from 1293 he was the Croatian ban's delegate at the Naples Court. His son, Mihovil, had the title of knight, was in the Šubić's service, succeeded his father on the position of the mayor of Nin (mentioned in 1306–1307), and probably died during the wars of Mladen II Šubić of Bribir. His son, Ivan, also had the title of a knight, lived in Nin where had a status of a noble citizen and founded family Mihaljević.

After the fall of Mladen II, the family lost prominence. In 1322 was mentioned certain Harbonja or Herbonja Budčić, whose heirs had a land Krnica near Krbavac Lug (today part of Radovin), while ten years before land Jarane. In 1351, Radoslav son of Zarnuk earned an estate in Poričani. In 1366, Nikola Cherbouig from Nin bought some land in Prahulje, while in 1373 are recorded Hlapac and Radoslav Pribišević. In 1383, nobleman Nelipac Jamomet had estates which bordered Krbavac Lug and Snojaci. In 1389, nobleman Grgur Kličković de genere Iamomet lived in Podlužje and sold some parts of lands there. A year later, nobleman Gostiša Križanić de genere Jamomet sold part of the land in village Rosulje. In 1391, Juraj son of Pavle of Jamomet from village Menišće sold some land in Podlužje. In the same year, previously mentioned Gostiša sold some land in Rosulje, which witnessed Juraj.

In 1412, Ostoja Novaković was a citizen of Nin. Some members like Lovro of Dražmil earned citizenship of Zadar. He had estates in Biljane which sold 1425 to Vlach Milovacije Bilojević, in Kamenjane since 1436, and 1441 in Turanj for 1600 ducats, as well as traded fabrics and invested 1500 ducats in a trade association. In 1433 and 1440 is recorded Vukašin Ančić de genere Jamomet who had the function of a noble judge in Luka županija. In 1481 are mentioned for the last time in the surroundings of Zadar. In the second half of the 15th century, in 1483 near Ostrožac Castle in the area of Pounje were some tribe estates managed by Burić and Juraj Mitković. The village Yamowech, later called Jamomet, was since 1330 gifted to the Babonić family by King Charles I of Hungary.

=== Notable members ===
- Andrija Jamometić (1420/1425–1484), a Dominican priest, diplomat and humanist, whose family was from Nin. Since 1475 was provincial of Greek Dominican province, since 1476 Archbishop of Krujë in Albania, and since 1478 in diplomatic missions for Frederick III, Holy Roman Emperor. At the Diets of Nuremberg in 1481 called for unified European effort against the Ottoman Empire conquest, and because of criticizing nepotism and debauchery at the court of Pope Sixtus IV, the Pope imprisoned him for a short period of time. In 1482 he tried to organize a continuation of Council of Basel–Ferrara–Florence with which would have been held a renewal of the Church and fight against the Ottomans, but on the Pope and Emperor's behalf was imprisoned in Basel, where died in suspicious circumstances. As he was excommunicated his remains were thrown into the river Rhine. His main work was Proclamatio concilii Basiliensis (1482).

== Bosnian and Herzegovinian family ==
In the 14th century a branch, possibly of Vučeta's cousins, was gifted with some estates in Zachlumia where are mentioned from 1333 until 1466. However, their relationship with Jamometić's in Dalmatia and Pounje is unclear. To them are also probably related surnames Mometa, and its branch Obradović, from Neretva, which connection to the Croatian tribe is also uncertain.

They are primarily mentioned in the documents of Republic of Ragusa (Dubrovnik), in which vicinity had estates. Earliest member is Vukoslav (1333), who is somehow connected to Milten Draživojević, an ancestor of the Sanković noble family. The lineage of Radoslav (1367), son Raško (1389) who was in service of Pavlović noble family in 1419, and grandson Dragiša (1419, 1423, 1426), was in good relations with Dubrovnik and had some estates in Konavle. However, when Konavle were sold by Radoslav Pavlović in 1426, Raško and Dragiša left their estates, with an unknown destiny of the lineage.

Another Vukoslav, possibly great-grandson of the first, was from župa Popovo (1417). He became a voivode in 1436 when seemingly served knez Grgur Nikolić, and later possibly was part of the Kosača hierarchy. His brother was probably Klapac (1417), who with his brothers were allowed to resettle their families and goods to Ston. To this Popovo line possibly belong Radonja (1453), Petar (1464), and voivode brothers Dragić and Tvrtko (1465–1466), who were the last to be mentioned.

In 1423, Petar Jamomet, whose relationship to Zachlumian Jamomet's is unknown, lived in Podvisoko of the Kingdom of Bosnia, and was in service of King Tvrtko II. He was married to Jonka and had a son Benko Petrović Jamometić (1448). His daughter Stanuša (1448) was married to Stjepko Pribisalić Murvić from Ston.

The existence of certain Velimir Jamometović (1446), who allegedly managed Serbian lands as a representative of King Thomas, is doubtful.

== See also ==
- Croatian nobility
- Twelve noble tribes of Croatia
- List of noble families of Croatia
