= Tugomirić family =

Noble tribe of the Kingdom of Croatia

The Tugomirić family, sometimes called Tugomerić or Tugomorić, was one of the twelve noble tribes of the Kingdom of Croatia. It was mentioned in the Pacta conventa (1102).

== Etymology ==
The family name is often related to the personal name of Touga, the White Croat sister who according to a legend from the 10th century De Administrando Imperio, led with her sister Bouga and five brothers the Croatian tribes during their migration to present-day Croatia. Vjekoslav Klaić noted that in 852 was a settlement Tugari in the Kingdom of Croatia which people in Latin sources were called as Tugarani and Tugarini. In the historical sources, the family name also comes in forms of Tugomirik, de progenie Tugumorich, de parentella Tugomirich among others.

== History ==
The tribe originally settled the area of Podgora župa, an area around Velebit and up to the river Zrmanja, with the center of the settlement being in Bag. Meanwhile, in the middle of the 13th century, their possessions were seized by Paul I Šubić of Bribir, most importantly Bag, and so they migrated into two directions: one part moved to the island of Krk, and the other part to the Zadar hinterland and Lika region.

The earliest supposedly known member of the genus is župan Mirogus de genere Tugomirorum, one of the twelve noblemen mentioned in Pacta conventa (1102) who negotiated with Coloman, King of Hungary, which is probably a forgery from mid-14th century. The Tugomirić family is mentioned to have been living in the hinterland of Zadar from 1189, when is mentioned Tolisius Tugomirik, until 1456 when they were last mentioned in this area. In the second half of the 14th and early 15th century, members, especially of Šegotić branch, managed to get some estates in the hinterland of Zadar, as well Nina and Luka županija, where were elected as judges.

In 1248, the Tugomorić family is mentioned in a list of four Croatian noble families of Krk. They probably lived in the town and surroundings of Vrbnik. It is considered that they have lived in Lika until the 1513, on the territory managed by Mogorović tribe, south of Ribnik, where was founded a village named Tugomerići. Part of the family moved south to Poljica, near Omiš. The name of the village of Tugare in that region is also linked to the Tugomirić family. As their estates were under threat of the Ottoman Empire conquest during the early 16th century, they steadily migrated to Slavonia and Hungary to the North, and Istria and Italian Peninsula to the West.

== Descendants ==
By the end of the 15th century in the village, Tugomerići branched five families: Babić, Sučić, Surotvić or Surotnić, possibly Piplić and Veseličić, whose members were regularly elected in judicial and governance functions, supervised by Mogorović family, in the županija of Lika.

In the aforementioned list of noble families of Krk, there is mention of Andrija Žic, Milonja Žic, Sprecije Dominikov, and others as being part of the Tugomirić family. Accordingly, the surname Žic, still common on Krk, especially in Punat, probably originated from the Tugomirić family. Therefore, because the Žic family originally lived in Vrbnik, it is speculated that the Tugomirić family was also present there.

Since it is believed that the famous Frankopan family originated from Krk, there is a possibility of their connection with the Tugomirić family.

== See also ==
- Croatian nobility
- Twelve noble tribes of Croatia
- List of noble families of Croatia
