= Lasničić family =

Croat noble family

The Lasničić family (Latin: Lacnicith, Lasincich, Lasnitichi, Lasnicit, Lasnizith, Laznichig, Lisnicig, Lisnicik), also known as Lačničić and Lisničić, was one of the twelve noble tribes of the Kingdom of Croatia, mentioned in the Pacta conventa.

== Etymology ==
In the sources as well as the Croatian scholar called them differently, varying between Lasničić, Lisničić, and Lačničić, but they called themselves as Lasničić.

== History ==
Their place of origination is considered to be in the area of the former Luka and Sidraga and županija in the Zadar-Biograd hinterland.

The earliest possible known ancestor of the genus is župan Obrad Lasničić, one of the twelve noblemen mentioned in Pacta conventa (1102). The earliest certain mention of the tribe is 1207 when are recorded Jutroš and Slavomir in two documents as witnesses to the donation of the church of St. Petar in Bubnjani to the monastery of St. Kuzma and Damjan near Biograd.

Until the beginning of the 14th century they had estates in Gacka županija, estates territory named after them, between Otočac and Doljani. However, in 1316-1323 King Charles I of Hungary gave their lands to Dujam II Frankopan, because of which Lasničić's name vanishes from Gacka.

In the same century are also mentioned regarding some business settlements in Zadar, as well in Raštani in Vransko district and Bičini near Zadar. Known members are Juraj, Dibudoj and Tolšo who died before 1380, of whom Juraj had an estate in Zadar. The last mention of the family was in 1448 when was mentioned Glagolitic priest Jakov who lived in Raštani.

=== Tolšić branch ===
The branch is named after župan Tolšo (Tolso Lassicich), who in 1275 is mentioned as a judge, while in 1322 as deceased. He possibly had a son named Hlapac who had in possession Juraj's estate in Zadar, bought by Tolšo from 14th century. In 1361 is recorded Martin, while in 1380 and 1388 Vladislav Tolšić who sold some land and had 1398 an estate in Lemeševo Hrašće. To them also belonged Šimun and Jakov who died before 1391-1399, of whom Jakov had a daughter Jelena who was a wife of Zadar citizen Ratko Drahiašić Čudomirić.

== See also ==
- Croatian nobility
- Twelve noble tribes of Croatia
- List of noble families of Croatia
