= Čudomirić family =

The Čudomirić family (Latin: Quddomirorum, Chudomirig, Cidomirig, Cudomericich, Cudimerig, Cudomirichys, Zudomerich, Zuddomirikion and Zudomirikion) was one of the twelve noble tribes of the Kingdom of Croatia, mentioned in the Pacta conventa and Supetar Cartulary.

== Etymology ==
Branimir Gušić argued the family name is related to toponym and village Tudjemili (Tjudjemili or Čudemili) near Bar, Montenegro, which are near other villages Dedići and Hrvatin with the church of St. Nicholas. As such he derived the name Čudomir-Čudomer from the Gothic personal name Thiudomer (Gothic thiuda "nation, folk, people").

== History ==
The earliest possible known ancestor of the genus is župan Pribislav Čudomirić, one of the twelve noblemen mentioned in Pacta conventa (1102). According to the Supetar Cartulary, they were one of six tribes which selected bans who, in turn, elected a new king in a case where the prior king died without leaving heirs. In it is mentioned Saruga or Sarubba (Zaruba) Cudomirig, whose most probably related to iupanus Sarubba, a companion of unknown Croatian king or pretender to the Croatian throne, Slavac, from the same source. By the 15th century they probably branched into many smaller tribes, or became part of other tribes, or lost the majority of its nobility status.

The earliest certain mention of the tribe is 1207 when appears Uste Zudomiriko as a witness (along with representatives of the tribe of Gusić, Mogorović, Kačić etc.) in two documents belonging to the church of St. Peter in Bubnjan, west of Tinj (near Benkovac). In 1232 document from the city of Zadar is recorded Milota Cidomirig regarding some lands of the Church of St. Chrysogonus, while Dobroje son of Vukoje Čudomirić in 1278 as a landlord in Čudomirćina or Čudomirić area near Zadar known as such until the 16th century. In 1348 and 1361 are recorded as witnesses Radoslav and Radič. In 1365, Gruban son of "condam Scenichi" was a resident and landlord in Kačina Gorica. Between 1391 and 1402 is mentioned Diminse Petrović regarding the land in Čudomiršćina. At the end of the 14th and beginning of the 15th century in Zadar lived sailor Matija Radušević, Juraj, Petar, Bartol, son of Borajka and so on. In 1399, nobleman Ratko Drahiašić was married to Jelena, daughter of Jakov Lasničić from Bitina in Gacka župa. The last mention by name in the city of Zadar is in 1509.

On 25 November 1371, in Split was made an agreement in which is mentioned that the Bogdan Vuković of village Čihović and "four proprietors of the village Siverić" in Petrovo Polje were part of vna generacione videlicet Cudomiricorum. The tribe's estate in Livno indirectly is mentioned by 15th forgery, presumably released in 1103 by Coloman, King of Hungary (villam in Cleuna Sudumirizam). In the 15th century some members lived also in other parts of Dalmatia, like in Trogir and Sukošan, and 1451 in Knin. In 1494, Conventual Franciscan, Matija Čudomirić, was the procurator of the monastery of St. Frane in Šibenik.

They also lived in the Lika region, in 1404 was recorded Simon son of Obrad from former village Hotušje behind Velebit. In 1503, Ivan Noić was a witness in Lagodušići (today Budak near Gospić), while in 1512, Jakov Vruković or Vrnković in Belaj (today Bilaj near Gospić), which is also tribe's last mention.

In the 15th century, one family also had an estate in Hrelić (today village Hrelići near New Zagreb in Zagorje region). Near the city of Samobor is a hill named Čudomeršćak, which is possibly related to tribal's name. In 1482, the king Matthias Corvinus ordered Kaptol to recognize proprietorship of Pavle Čudomirić, an official of Serbian Despot Vuk Grgurević Branković. In 1501, Pavle's wife Lucija, then a widow with daughters Barbara and Dorotea, wrote to Corvinus for having her estates violently appropriated.

== See also ==
- Croatian nobility
- Twelve noble tribes of Croatia
- List of noble families of Croatia
