= Kukar family =

The Kukar family (Latin: de genere Cucar, Cucarorum, Chucarorum, Cucar, Cucari, Cuccari, Chucar, Chuchar, Chucharo, Kukarow, Kukarorum) was one of the twelve noble tribes of the Kingdom of Croatia, mentioned in the Pacta conventa and Supetar Cartulary.

== Etymology ==
The etymological derivation is unknown. In the scholarship, it has been related to the personal name of White Croat Kloukas, one of the seven brothers and sisters who led the Croatian tribes during their migration to present-day Croatia according to De Administrando Imperio (10th century).

== History ==
The earliest possible known ancestor of the genus is župan Ugrin Kukar, one of the twelve noblemen mentioned in Pacta conventa (1102). According to Supetar Cartulary addendum, one of the bans in the Kingdom of Croatia until the death of Croatian king Demetrius Zvonimir was Stephanus Cucar, as well Slauaz Cucar at the time of King Presimir from the tribe of Cucar. There's a possibility that certain Petar, whom representatives of the city of Split sent to the king Ladislaus I of Hungary, was from the tribe, also the first Hungarian-appointed ban Ugra/Ugrin at the time of king Coloman, King of Hungary (or from the Csák tribe).

Their first certain mention of the tribe is in 1177-78, in the area of Podstrana (near Split), where was located the "Kukari territory" (territorium Cucarorum). In the historical sources, they are more commonly recorded in the 15th century, when are mentioned living in Luka županija, around Ostrovica, Zadar, Šibenik and Skradin. Their centre was in the hinterland of Skradin, between villages Budak (Budačići, Hrupalci, Tulovci), Rakitnica, Krković and Čulišić (former Kulišić). In 1406, former village Biljane, today hamlet and part of Sonković near Skradin, was also named Kukar which is preserved until today as toponym of a near hill, as well there was a source and stream Cocur. In 1434 the Kukar toponym related to two other villages near Ždrapanj and East of Vrlika.

It is considered that by the 15th century the tribe broke up into family branches, including Kulišić (from which emerged Milutinić, 1497), Mirogerutić (1428), Budačić (1428), Cvitojević (1484), and Hatežević (1492) among others. One branch from Krković near Bribir was named as Šubić (Georgius Swbych de genere Kukarorum, 1443), possibly being related to the Šubić family, but the relationship is unclear. The first certainly recorded members are Nikleuš and Cvitoj Budačić, sons of deceased Marko Kukar, in 1393. Cvitoj's descendant Ivan Cvitojević in 1484 sold estates in several villages. Pavao Budačić from Kriković was mentioned as a noble judge in Podgrađe of Luka županija in 1419 and 1428. In 1447 are recorded Vukša son of Bogdan Kuzmić, a judge in Tinj near Benkovac, and his uncle Mihael Šibica regarding sell of all estates in Tulovci. A nobleman from Skradin and citizen of Zadar, Stipša Stipšić, sold estates in Skradin district in 1454, while in 1457 and 1461 near Zadar. The noble judges in Luka županija were also Pavao Hetežević and Stjepan Mišljenović in the 1490s. The last known mention of the tribe on the territory of Zadar is from 1581, by "Magister Matija" on Pag.

It is considered that the family Kokarić, mentioned in the 15th century in Zadar and Šibenik, is not part of the tribe.

== See also ==
- Croatian nobility
- Twelve noble tribes of Croatia
- List of noble families of Croatia
