= Poletčić family =

Mediaeval Croatian family

The Poletčić family (Politchorum, Poletchis, Polecich), also known as Polečić or Poličić, was one of the twelve noble tribes of the Kingdom of Croatia, mentioned in the Pacta conventa. They until the 15th century had estates in the region of Lika, around Perušić, and citizen status in the city of Zadar.

== History ==
The earliest possible known ancestor of the genus is župan Pribislav Poletčić (Pribislauus de genere Politchorum), one of the twelve noblemen mentioned in Pacta conventa (1102), which is probably a mid-14th-century forgery.

In the region of Lika, they had estates South-East of Perušić (Čelopeci, Kučani, Tri Vasi, Sokolci) in the former Buška županija (county). In 1285 they had an estate in the village of Miljača, today around Zemunik Gornji in the Zadar County. From the second half of the 14th century, many families had smaller estates in the Zadar hinterland, like 1359 when is recorded Vladac Dorosalić Polečić from Tršćan, as well on the territories of Ninska, Lučka and Kninska županija.

In the between with 15th century, some individuals had a citizen status in Zadar wherein the upcoming period acted as "prominent city officials, surgeons and priests". Until the end of 15th century the branched into many families and hiže, specifically Banić, Brutinić, Dudić, Dulčić, Filčić, Halić, Jadrejić, Marojić, Perojić, Pilicarić, Šabalić, Umčić, Utulić, and Vukšić, who along the Kršelac and Stupić nobleman from Bužani, were part of the judicial and administrative service of the županija.

At the end of the 15th century, their estates in Bužanska, Kninska and Lučka županija were under attack of the Ottoman Empire military forces and because of it, they retreated to Zadar, Nin and near islands like Pag which were under control of the Republic of Venice, eventually to the Italian Peninsula.

== See also ==
- Croatian nobility
- Twelve noble tribes of Croatia
- List of noble families of Croatia
