= Snačić family =

Croatian noble family

The Snačić family, sometimes called Svačić and Svadčić, was one of the twelve noble tribes of Croatia, mentioned in the Pacta conventa and Supetar Cartulary.

== History ==
The earliest possible known ancestor of the genus is župan Juraj Snačić, one of the twelve noblemen mentioned in Pacta conventa (1102).

Among the oldest known members of the family is Petar Snačić, who was a ban during the reign of king Demetrius Zvonimir. In older historiography and in the public he is identified with king Petar, who is likely to have been the last Croatian king of Croatian descent.

Information about the family is scarce. In 1343 was recorded certain Gojslav, son of a person called Prodi de Saucichorum in the Klis županija. Some historians also assume that nobleman Domald of Sidraga (c. 1160–1243) was a member of the family, but this cannot be reliably proven.

== Nelipić branch ==
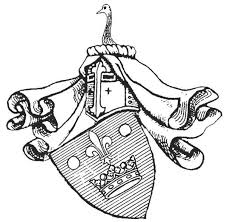
The coat of arms of the Nelipić family

A member of the tribe in the first half of the 14th century was Nelipac (generationis Suadcich), the head of the Nelipić family of Cetina, which is a cadet branch of the Snačić family.

In all likelihood, the Snačić family went extinct patrilineally after the death of Ban Ivan III Nelipić in 1435, and their heirdoms were given by king Sigismund to Matko and Petar Talovac.

=== Notable members ===
- Ivan Nelipić
- Ivan II Nelipić
- Ivan III Nelipić
- Jelena Nelipić - Queen of Bosnia

== See also ==
- Croatian nobility
- Twelve noble tribes of Croatia
- List of noble families of Croatia
