= Pacta conventa =

Pacta conventa may refer to:

- Pacta conventa (Poland), an agreement between the Polish nobility and king, entered into between 1573 and 1764
- Pacta conventa (Croatia), an agreement between the medieval Croatian nobility and the King of Hungary
