= Missal of duke Novak =

- Language: Church Slavonic

Missal of duke Novak (Croatian: Misal kneza Novaka) was a 14th-century Glagolitic missal. The letters of the missal were later used for the first Croatian printed book Missale Romanum Glagolitice.

== Description ==
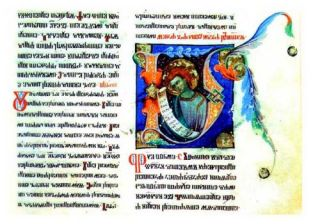
Missal

The missal itself was written in Croatian recension of the Church Slavonic language, in the Croatian angular Glagolitic script and quite possibly illuminated, by the royal knight Novak Disislavić on his estates in Krbava in 1368. The author's family descended from the Mogorović gentis, which at that time belonged to the medieval institution Nobiles duodecim generationum regni Croatiae. He was also named the duke of Šolgov in Hungary and duke of Nin in Dalmatia. The missal was written as a pledged gift to a church, where he was to be buried after death.

The last page (colophon) also contains written down verses in Chakavian by the author, a sequence of Christian mortality:

I pomisli vsaki h(rst)janin

da se svyt ništare ni,
jere gdo ga veće ljubi,
ta ga brže zgubi.

Nu jošće pomisli vsaki sada:
ča se najde ot nas tada,
gda se d(u)ša strahom smete,

a dila n(a)m skriti nete...

== History ==
After Disislavić's death, the missal was not gifted to a church, but was kept by his sons. Ultimately, Novak Disislavić's son Petar, forced by financial trouble, sold it in 1405 for 45 ducats. The missal was then used by churches in Istria, where it remained for four centuries. In 1820, the missal was bought by Giovanni Battista Hettinger, an antiquarian, who brought it to Austria. Today, it is kept in the Austrian National Library in Vienna.

== See also ==
- List of Glagolitic manuscripts (1300–1399)
- Lists of Glagolitic manuscripts

== Bibliography ==
- Klaić, Nada (1956). "Plemstvo dvanaestero plemena kraljevine Hrvatske" (PDF). Historijski zbornik (in Croatian). IX (1–4): 83–100. Archived from the original (PDF) on 8 August 2018.
- Klaić, Vjekoslav (1900). "O knezu Novaku (1368.)" (PDF). Vjesnik Arheološkog muzeja u Zagrebu (in Croatian). 4 (1): 177–180.
