= Mogorić =

- Village
- Location within Croatia
- Coordinates: 44°29′21″N 15°35′27″E
- Country: Croatia
- Region: Lika
- County: Lika-Senj
- City: Gospić

Area
  - Total: 54.5 km^{2} (21.0 sq mi)
- Elevation: 599 m (1,965 ft)

Population (2021)
  - Total: 80
  - Density: 1.5/km^{2} (3.8/sq mi)
- Time zone: UTC+1 (CET)
  - Summer (DST): UTC+2 (CEST)
- Postal code: 53205
- Area code: 053

Mogorić is a village in the Lika-Senj County, Croatia. The settlement is administered as a part of the city of Gospić.

== Location ==
It is located in Lika, 23 kilometers from Gospić.

== History ==
Mogorić is named after the Mogorović family, who built a fortress in the village. In 1577, the fortress was recorded as being manned by Ottoman soldiers.

== Population ==
According to national census of 2011, population of the settlement is 110. This represents 28.72% of its pre-war population according to the 1991 census.

The 1991 census recorded that 94.52% of the village population were ethnic Serbs (362/383), 1.04% were Croats (4/383), 0.26% were Yugoslavs (1/383) while 4.18% were of other ethnic origin (16/383).

Historical population 1857-2011
v

population	1437	1509	1489	1709	1724	1677	1769	1740	1230	1096	940	764	562	383	93	110
	1857	1869	1880	1890	1900	1910	1921	1931	1948	1953	1961	1971	1981	1991	2001	2011

Sources: Croatian Bureau of Statistics publications

== Bibliography ==
- Grahovac-Pražić, Vesna; Vrcić-Mataija, Sanja (2010). "Ojkonimi gospićkog područja" (PDF). Folia Onomastica Croatica (in Croatian) (19): 81–96.
