= Petar Crni =

Croatian nobleman

Petar Crni (Latin: Petrus Zerni) was a Croatian nobleman, dignitary and Latin poet in the second half of the 11th century.

== Biography ==
He was most likely born in the city of Split during the middle of the 11th century, to Gumaj, who was the son of Mihača. Other sources claim he was the son of Črne, the prior of Split. His brother Dabrus was a monk of the royal monastery of St. Stephen Beneath the Pines near Split. He was a sympathizer of the reforms of Pope Gregory VII and thus on the side of the latinist column in Dalmatia and Croatia, despite his Slavic (Croat) background. He was eventually married to Anna, daughter of the Split nobleman Maius Favo.

He is mostly known for founding the monastery of St. Peter in Selo, a location in medieval Poljica, together with his wife on 11 October 1080 during the reign of king Demetrius Zvonimir. The building complex included residential buildings, encompassed with a wall. Petar Crni endowed the monastery with land (in Poljica, Split and the island of Brač) and adorned it with art, silver utensils and eucharistic vestments. The monastery had a rich library at its disposition for its time - around 25 scrolls, although none of it survives. The history of the monastery is largely chronicled in the early 12th-century Supetar Cartulary, which reveal Petar Crni as the most prolific slave trader in the region, on which the monastery's economy largely rested. Trading included with people from Šibenik, Knin, the surrounding region and with foreign merchants such as the Lombards.

After reaching old age, he became a monk in the same monastery, where he died, supposedly at the beginning of the 12th century.

== Epitaph ==
A stone slab records a hexameter poem, whose first four verses are attributed to Petar Crni himself, with the other verses engraved by his brother Dobre. Peter's verses are regarded as being original and standing out to similar poetry at that time.

The first four verses are:

TAM SORDENTE DOMO PERSPICE QVID SIT OMO / IN REBUS STVLTIS STVDVI NICHIL VTILE MVLTIS / ET DVM UIGVI TERROR IN ORBE FVI/PARVM ADVC DICAM DE MEI CORPORIS V(I) T(A)M

In such a perspiring house look at what a man is
In the earthly foolishness I tried not to be of use to anyone
And while I was rugged, I was fear to the world
That is all i can say about my (earthly) life

== Sources ==
- Novak, Viktor; Skok, Petar, eds. (1952). Supetarski kartular. Zagreb: JAZU. OCLC 443272968.
