= Andrija Jamometić =

- Born: 1420
- Died: 1484 (aged 63–64)
- Other names: Andrea Zamometić
- Occupation: Dominican

Andrija Jamometić or Andrea Zamometić (1420–1484) was a Dominican who tried to reform the Catholic Church through conciliarism. Part of the noble Jamomet family, he failed to revive the Council of Basel and unite all Europeans against the advancing Ottoman Empire. He graduated from Padua University and was the titular Archbishop of Skadarska Krajina (near Lake Skadar) from 1476 until his death.

== Sources ==
- Lapina, Dr Elizabeth; Morris, Dr April Jehan; Throop, Asst Prof Susanna A (28 November 2015). The Crusades and Visual Culture. Ashgate Publishing, Ltd. ISBN 978-1-4724-4926-9.
- Novak, Slobodan Prosperov (2003). Povijest hrvatske književnosti: od Baščanske ploče do danas. Golden marketing. ISBN 9789532120332.
- Croatica (1983). Croatica Christiana Periodica.
