= Twelve noble tribes of Croatia =

Medieval institution of nobility

The twelve noble tribes of Croatia (Latin: nobiles duodecim generationum regni Croatie), also known as twelve noble families of Croatia, was a medieval institution of nobility, alliance, or narrow noble community in the Kingdom of Croatia, which can be traced back at least to the 14th century, while the first mention of the institution was in the Pacta conventa document, which is supposedly a later copy of the original from 1102. Regardless of possible earlier references, the first verifiable mention dates from 1350, while the last from 1459. It is considered that by socio-economic power it was composed of lower and middle nobility, which had a privilege of retain and use of heirdom, tax exemption, and limited military obligations to the king. The twelve tribes are Čudomirić, Gusić, Kačić, Kukar, Jamomet, Lasničić, Lapčan and Karinjan, Mogorović, Poletčić, Snačić, Šubić, and Tugomirić.

== History ==
After the death of Croatian kings Demetrius Zvonimir in 1089 and Petar Snačić in 1097, seemingly twelve nobles (XII nobile sapienciores or elder župans) of the twelve tribes of Croatia (de XII tribus Chroatie), as representatives met with Coloman, King of Hungary, to sign a treaty Pacta conventa and enter into a personal union with Hungary. By the document they were guaranteed that would retain their possessions and properties without interference, the mentioned families would be exempted from tax or tributes to the king, with limited military service that were obliged to answer the king's call if someone attacked his borders and send at least ten armed horsemen to war, as far as the Drava river (Croatia's northern boundary with Hungary) at their own expense while beyond that point, the Hungarian king paid the expenses. Although the authenticity of the document is disputed to be a late-14th century forgery, the tax exemptions and hereditary possession of land by feudal lords, Croatian political autonomy and other indicate some mutual agreement did take place at the time of Coloman's coronation in 1102. The noblemen who reportedly signed the treaty are: Juraj Kačić, Ugrin Kukar, Mrmonja Šubić, Pribislav Čudomirić, Juraj Snačić, Petar Murić (or Mogorović), Pavao Gusić, Martin Karinjan and Lapčan, Pribislav Poletčić (or Paletčić), Obrad Lačničić (or Lasničić), Ivan Jamomet, Mironjeg Tugomir(ić).

Next, and an indirect mention would be in 1273 charter by King Ladislaus IV of Hungary who gave the tribe of Glamočani, (Note: According to Vjekoslav Klaić, Stjepan Pavičić, and Stjepan Antoljak other Croatian medieval tribes were Stupić, Kršelac, Humljan, Nebljuh, Lagodušić, Virević, Hlivnjan or Čubranić, Bučić, Unačac or Unčan, Kremeničan, Limiš, Tišemir, Dživić, Slavogostić, Hotučan, Vuković, Dabran, Zagorac, Doljan, Prkalj (Perkal), Kolunić, Cvjetnić, Mekinjan, Bobinac, Zunković, Zmana or Zmina, Vukomanić, Vrbašić, Viktorić, Ugrinić, Ueglac, Tiskovac, Strmičan, Runjevac (Rugneuac), Ramljan, Plusarić, Pribudić, Osnac, Murić, Kupinić, Krivošić, Kamenjan, Dlamozan or Glamočan, Draganić, Dravilcin, Cotugno, Chupinich, Cerenčan, Bradić, Babonožić, Dražuljan and possibly Criscelzo, Doganić, Suczunuy, Zudinić, Adrianik, Budimiriz, Couaciz, Scemesceuich, Srenan, and Tugaran or Tugarin among many others.) the same status as "true, first and natural nobles of the Kingdom of Croatia". In 1318 document by Ban of Croatia, Mladen II Šubić of Bribir, when emerged a quarrel between Draganić family who emigrated to Zadar and those who stayed in a same-named village Draganić, was mentioned numero duodenario. Historian Ferdo Šišić considered it to be related to the twelve tribes, but most probably it was an erroneous interpretation because that number was commonly used in court disputes.

In the Supetar Cartulary which includes information until the 12th century, but the specific writing about the bans and župans is dated at least to the mid or late-14th century. It mentions that there existed seven bans (of Croatia, Bosnia, Sclavonia, Požega, Podravina, Albania, Srijem) in the Kingdom of the Croats, and they were elected by the six of twelve Croatian noble tribes (specifically Kačić, Kukar, Snačić, Čudomirić, Mogorović, and Šubić), while from other six noble tribes the comes in comitatus (župans in župa). The bans elected the king in the kingdom if the king did not leave male heir. The bans who can be possibly transcribed are Stephanus Cucar, Saruba Cudomirig, Quirica, Petar Mogorouig, Cacig, Marian Cacig, Slauaz Cucar at the time of King Presimir from the tribe of Cucar, while at the time of King Demetrius Zvonimir was Petrus Sna(cich). It is considered that the number of seven bans of seven Banovina is influenced by the writer's contemporary knowledge of sevens nobles who elect the German king, as well tradition of seven brothers and sisters in De Administrando Imperio by Constantine VII and seven tribus nobilium in Historia Salonitana by Thomas the Archdeacon. Držislav Švob (1956) considered that the purpose of the document was to show the illegitimacy of the Hungarian rule over the Kingdom of Croatia because as the Croatian king did not have any descendants the bans should have elected the new king and it contradicts the Pacta Conventa which was not signed by the bans, as well was made up by the Church of Split on the behalf of Hrvoje Vukčić Hrvatinić to neglect Hungarian pretensions on the Kingdom of Bosnia which developed from the Banate of Bosnia.

The first verifiable mention of duodecim generationes Croatorum dates from 1350/51 from a decree by the Ban of Croatia, Stephen I Lackfi, to the Virević noble family who came to the Croatian noble assembly (Sabor) in Podbrižane, part of former Lučka županija. The family claimed to be nobles, and most probably wanted to become part of the alliance. Sabor noted that they did not were part of the twelve nobles tribes, although did have maternal connections with them, and because of which were nobles. The source is important because it shows the nobility was divided into common "nobles" and "narrow caste community".

The term "nobility of the twelve tribes of the Kingdom of Croatia" (nobiles duodecim generationum regni Croatie) can also be found in a decree from 1360, when nobles from Cetina, Ivan and Lacko sons of Tvrdoja and Tvrtko son of Juraj Grubić, in the city of Zadar in front of Queen Elizabeth of Bosnia accused Ivan Nelipčić for deportation, negation of their noble rights which were the same as of the twelve noble tribes, and heirdom. Nelipčić kept them in prison because did not pay tax and make military service. The royal court concluded that the nobles did no originate from the twelve noble tribes, but all of them did acknowledge their noble status. The terms of heirdom, tax, and military service are directly related to the points from Pacta conventa, making its dating to the same century.

Another possible indirect reflection of the status is by King Louis I of Hungary in 1360/61 document when freed from tax some nobles from the city of Zadar; and in 1370 when Filip Franjina of the Nozdronja branch of the tribe of Draganić also from Zadar, who got the privileges like those of nobiles regni Croacie duodecim generacionum. In 1400, Bosnian King Stephen Ostoja Kotromanić gave all the lands of župa and city of Hlivno to Hrvoje Vukčić Hrvatinić and his son Balša. In order to know exactly which territories were under the royal authority of King Louis I until 1370 were gathered twelve nobles from Hlivno. Historian Miho Barada related it to the institution, while Nada Klaić considered it as a local hereditary tribal organization with a public function. The last time the alliance of twelve tribes was mentioned is 1459, when podban Mihovil Živković and judges from Knin gave an explanation on the inheritance of land among nobility to a knez from Zadar.

== Function ==
Historian Ferdo Šišić in 1925 argued that the Croatian nobility in the Middle Age was divided into higher (bans, župans and court nobles comites), and lower nobility. The first was formed by the most prominent tribes and their genus, branch families, some of whom managed to reach even magnate status. The core of both, especially higher, would make the twelve noble tribes. According to Šišić's scheme of the nobility development, from 7th until the 11th century was old nobility, in 12th and 13th century was formed the list of noble tribes, while in 14th and 15th century the twelve noble tribes became mentioned as a complete institution. However, such static and linear development is not credible, considered as an attempt to support and be supported by the Pacta conventa. Milan Šufflay supported the existence of old nobility from which developed the alliance of twelve noble tribes, but the family branches rose to power being allies of Árpád dynasty and Hungarian feudalism, making them a threat to own and other noble tribes. He considered that the original task of this institution was the protection of the rights of the lower nobility from the attacks and mistreatment of large feudal families that had started to form. Meanwhile, when Louis I of Hungary (1342–1382) crushed the power of the dynastic nobility and restored royal authority, introducing Hungarian law system, the members of the lower nobility stood up for Croatian rights (consuetudinis Croatorum). Ljudmil Hauptmann and Miho Barada noted that the nobility status was related to land ownership, and nobilis in documents was an honorary denominator for a prominent individual and not evidence for class-organized nobility.

Nada Klaić, who rejected the Pacta conventa as a complete forgery, argued that the tribes with the institution and forgeries wanted "to have a legal base to assert their authority over others in Croatia", and that Louis I accepted or formed the alliance for easier establishment of his authority i.e. some were exempt from paying taxes. She also argued that not all family branches were part of the alliance of twelve tribes, specifically those who were not part of the lower nobility, like Šubić's branch from Bribir, Kačići from Omiš, Gusići from Krbava, Tugomirići from Krk and others. However, such class conflict narrative between higher and lower nobility is also related to the ideological perspective of the 1950s. She noted the nobility status was related to the tax exemption, like for example in the 1248 case from the island of Krk when were mentioned some nobles from tribes of Doganich, Subinich, Tugomorich, and Zudinich, as well the Senj Statute from 1388, and to the military service, which reminds on privileges to noblemen from Krk in 1193 and 1251 and perhaps to the Golden Bull of 1242.

In comparison to historiographical opinions until the 1950s, Tomislav Raukar in his 2002 analysis of sources concluded that between 12th and 15th century in Croatia the nobility was diversified between lower nobility divided between general nobles and twelve noble tribes from whom emerged higher noble magnates. According to Raukar, sources from the 12th century do not show caste noble organization. The decree of Mladen II Šubić in 1322 in which are mentioned individuals from tribes of Prkalj, Jamomet, and Bilinjan without the title of nobiles, and with the title nobiles the Šubić from Bribir and Madija de Varicassis from Zadar patricianship; 1358 decree by Ban of Croatia, Ivan Ćuz, by which were returned lands to noble tribe of Prkalj taken away by knez Grgur of Krbava; 1396 decree by Sabor in Nin which freed them from paying imposed taxes by the King Tvrtko I of Bosnia, also stating they were "true and from antiquity nobles", which will be confirmed in 1412 by Sigismund, Holy Roman Emperor; indicate the lower nobility status was not formed before 1322 and for it needed that no feudal or magnate authority was in between the tribal and king authority. Seemingly the twelve tribes could only have territory on which was king's authority, and that's why tribes in Krbava-Zadar got privileged status and those in Cetina did not. However, there is no document in which one of twelve noble tribes needed the help of the king's authority to confirm the nobility privileges, indicating they were recognized.

== The twelve tribes ==
The tribes and their territories were located to the Kupa river in the North, West alongside Gvozd Mountain to Kvarner Gulf, going South until the Cetina river with the exception of Kačić family which went until Neretva river, and East-North into inland until Una river. Klaić considered that all families originated in the former Lučka županija with which disputed their legitimacy for representation of all Croatia, but Hauptmann and Josip Lučić opposed such claims as there's no evidence on the relationship of the županija and several families. Raukar, citing Barada and Klaić, also considered that wide Zadar-Biograd na Moru hinterland and Lučka županija (centered in Ostrovica Fortress and located in 14th century between Lička county in Northwest, Kninska in Northeast, Dridska and Primorska in the South) were the origin place of the tribes. Ivan Majnarić noted that Mogorović, Snačić, Tugomirić, Gusić, Lapčan, and Poletčić tribe do not support such an exclusive connection to Lučka županija, and that until today the localization has not been resolved. According to Raukar, already from the second half of the 12th century they started moving to near areas and cities, especially city of Zadar. In the first half of the 13th century, some members of the tribes lost the status and became serfs of Zadar monasteries, while in the first half of the 15th century Karinjan, Mogorović, and Šubić-Marković families sold some of their heritage estates to citizens of Zadar.

It is considered that votive church and patron saint similar to slava, of Mogorović, Kačić, and Lapčan tribes was Saint John, while of Šubić was Saint Mary, Saint John and Saint George. In the seat of Jamomet tribe was also a church of St. George.

1. Čudomirić
2. Gusić
3. Kačić
4. Kukar
5. Jamomet
6. Lasničić
7. Lapčan and Karinjan
8. Mogorović
9. Poletčić
10. Snačić
11. Šubić
12. Tugomirić

== Fraternity of Croats ==
Another union of Croatian nobility was the so-called Fraternity of Croats, mentioned in 1430 and held in the Cathedral of Saint Bartholomew in Kapitul near Knin, which included a wider group of Croatian noblemen, dignitaries and landlords "linked to the court seats of the Croatian counties", at the time led by Ivaniš Nelipić, Karlo and Toma Kurjaković, to defend the Croatian legal customs. Before that in a 1401 source the Croatian noblemen from separate tribes, of Lasničić and Mogorović, also considered each other as "brothers" (frater).

== See also ==
- Croatian nobility
- List of noble families of Croatia
