= Brekovica =

Brekovica Брековица
- Village
- Location within Bosnia and Herzegovina
- Coordinates: 44°53′N 15°53′E
- Country: Bosnia and Herzegovina
- Entity: Federation of Bosnia and Herzegovina
- Canton: Una-Sana
- Municipality: Bihać

Area
  - Total: 4.60 sq mi (11.92 km^{2})

Population (2013)
  - Total: 1,618
  - Density: 351.6/sq mi (135.7/km^{2})
- Time zone: UTC+1 (CET)
  - Summer (DST): UTC+2 (CEST)

Brekovica (Serbian Cyrillic: Брековица) is a village in the municipality of Bihać, Bosnia and Herzegovina.

== Demographics ==
According to the 2013 census, its population was 1,618.

Ethnicity in 2013
| Ethnicity | Number | Percentage |
|---|---|---|
| Bosniaks | 1,603 | 99.1% |
| Croats | 2 | 0.1% |
| other/undeclared | 13 | 0.8% |
| Total | 1,618 | 100% |
