= Georg Holzer =

Georg Holzer (born 1957 in Vienna) is an Austrian Slavist and Indo-Europeanist.

After graduating in Slavic Studies and Indo-European Studies at the University of Vienna, he earned his doctorate in 1982. Immediately thereafter he started a three-year appointment as a lecturer for German language at the Faculty of Humanities and Social Sciences in Zagreb. Since 1997 he has been an associate professor at the Institute for Slavic Studies at the University of Vienna. He also occasionally teaches at the universities of Zagreb and Zadar.

Holzer is the author of five books and over 50 scientific articles. In 1995, Holzer devised a new theory about the state of the Proto-Slavic language around 600 AD. After initial skepticism, the far-reaching statements on a relatively narrow empirical basis have been recognized in comparative Slavistics. Holzer is the author of the article Urslawisch ('Proto-Slavic') published in the Lexikon der Sprachen des europäischen Ostens ('Encyclopaedia of the languages of the European East'). This is part of the plan of the Austrian Ministry of Science since 2000. The Encyclopedia of the European East ('Enzyklopädie des europäischen Ostens, EEO) has been published, in Klagenfurt.

In 1989, Holzer suggested the existence of a "temematic substrate" in Proto-Slavic, comprising at least 45 words borrowed from an unknown (undocumented) Indo-European language.

Holzer directs the ongoing research project started in January 2001: The language of the medieval Slavs in Austria (Die Sprache des mittelalterlichen Slawentums in Österreich), conducted by the Austrian Academy of Sciences, with research assistant Angela Bergermayer. As a result of this project a dictionary of medieval Slavic words and glosses will be published, based on toponomastic material covering the territory of Austria.

== Books ==
- Entlehnungen aus einer bisher unbekannten indogermanischen Sprache im Urslavischen und Urbaltischen. Austrian Academy of Sciences, Vienna 1989, ISBN 3-7001-1552-0
- Das Erschließen unbelegter Sprachen. Zu den theoretischen Grundlagen der genetischen Linguistik. Peter Lang, Frankfurt am Main u.a. 1996, ISBN 3-631-49372-X
- Die Slaven im Erlaftal. Eine Namenlandschaft in Niederösterreich. Editor Anton Eggendorfer and Willibald Rosner, NÖ Inst. für Landeskunde, Sankt Pölten 2001 ISBN 3-85006-135-3
- Rekonstruowanie języków niepoświadczonych. Pod redakcją Wacława Waleckiego. Przekład Jolanta Krzysztoforska-Doschek. Collegium Columbinum, Cracow 2001, ISBN 83-87553-37-9
- Historische Grammatik des Kroatischen. Einleitung und Lautgeschichte der Standardsprache, Peter Lang 2007, Frankfurt am main, ISBN 978-3-631-56119-5
- Untersuchungen zum Urslavischen. Einleitende Kapitel, Lautlehre, Morphematik. Peter Lang, Berlin 2020, ISBN 978-3-631-81663-9
