= Supetar Cartulary =

- Sumpetar Cartulary; Cartulary of St. Peter on the territory of the Republic of Poljica; Jura sancti Petri de Gomai
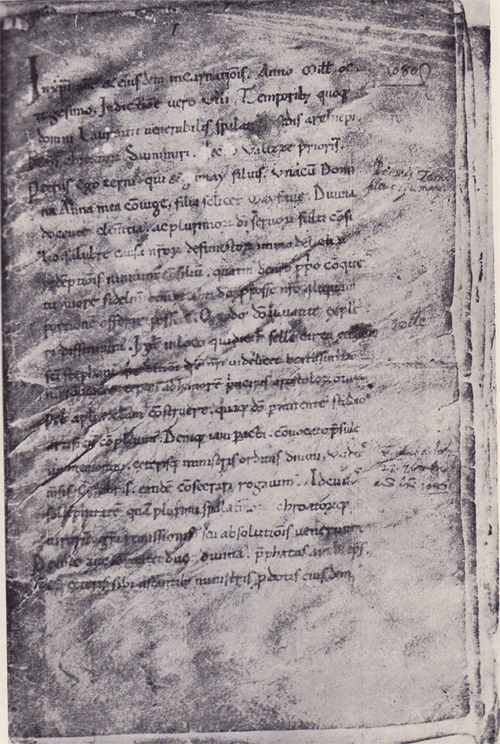
- First page of the Supetar Cartulary
- Language: medieval Latin
- Date: varies, 1105 - 14th century (mostly 12th century)
- Provenance: Monastery of St. Peter on the territory of the Republic of Poljica (ruins)
- Authenticity: The main part is generally accepted as authentic, with later additions as spurious
- First printed edition: 1844 by Frano Carrara
- Genre: Cartulary
- Length: 30 leaves total
- Subject: Charters of monastery of St. Peter in Selo on the territory of the Republic of Poljica, Croatia
- Period covered: 11th and 12th century
- Personages: Demetrius Zvonimir of Croatia, Lawrence, Archbishop of Split, Petar Crni

Supetar cartulary or Sumpetar cartulary (Croatian: Supetarski kartular) is a 12th-century cartulary which contains charters from the years 1080 to 1187.

Although the cartulary itself just lists the possessions of the monastery of St. Peter in Selo on the territory of the Republic of Poljica, Croatia and the ways through which they were acquired (such as purchase or grants), it also contains a few important historical notes. It is preserved in its original form. In its basis, the cartulary is actually a chronicle of the Benedictine monastery which was founded around 1080 by a Croatian dignitary and slave owner Petar Crni (Peter the Black).

Today, it is kept in the treasury of the Cathedral of Saint Domnius in Split.

== Description ==
The cartulary traces the foundation of the monastery of Saint Peter on the territory of the Republic of Poljica, near the hamlet of Sumpetar (located in today's Jesenice) on October 11, 1080, during the reign of king Demetrius Zvonimir. It was founded by a local nobleman Petar Crni, son of Gumaj, and his wife Mary. The document represents an important insight into the social and economic situation and circumstances in 11th-century Croatia and Dalmatia. It chronologically lists land exchanges, and more importantly, the acquisition of slaves, which had been a profitable trade in the region.

It contains rich onomastics material. Apart from personal names of Slavic, Roman and Christian origin, it also contains vernacular nicknames such as Platichlebi (plati + hleb, "buy bread"), Tilstacossa (Tusta kosa, thick hair), Urascana (Vraškonja) and so on.

=== Later addendum ===
The cartulary also contains a later addendum, with information on the political situation in late 11th century Croatia, naming six feudal noble families (Čudomirić, Kačić, Kukar, Mogorović, Snačić, Šubić) from which bans (viceroys) of Croatia, Bosnia, Slavonia, Požega, Podravina, Albania and Srijem were elected from and others which were eligible for being elected as župans and states that in the case that the reigning king of Croatia dies without an heir a new king is elected by the bans, giving primacy to the bans of Croatia, Bosnia, and Slavonia. However, the specific writing about bans is dated to the late 13th and early 14th century, and was constructed for political purposes.
