= Pacta conventa (Croatia) =

1102 agreement defining Croatia's status within Hungary

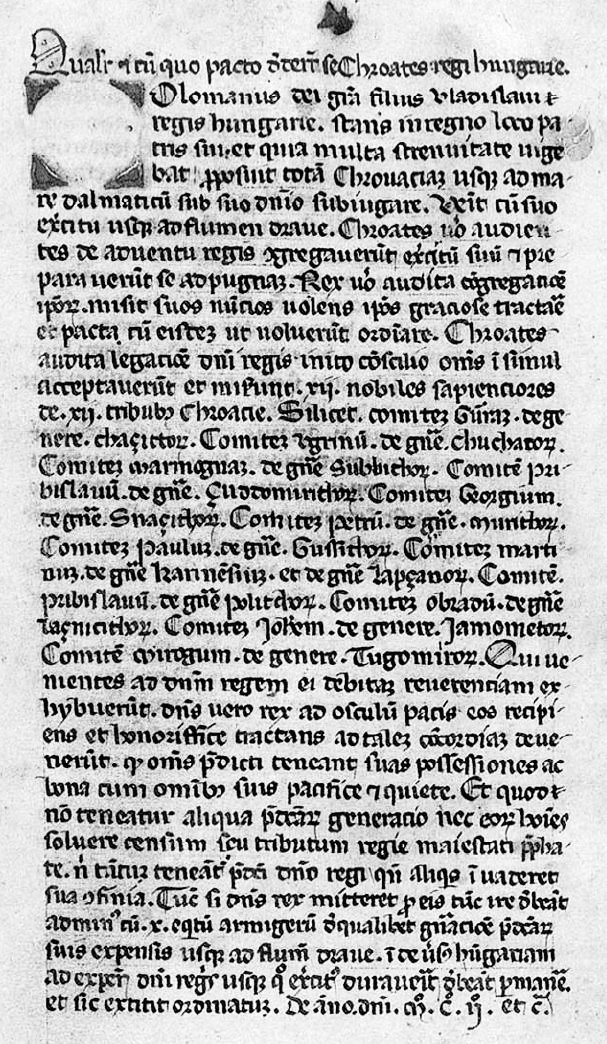
- Photo of a copy of Pacta conventa or Qualiter
- Created: 1102; 14th century (manuscript)
- Location: Budapest
- Purpose: Agreement concluded between King Coloman of Hungary and the Croatian nobility

Pacta conventa (lit. 'agreed accords') was an agreement concluded between King Coloman of Hungary and the Croatian nobility in 1102 or afterwards, defining the status of Croatia in the union with Hungary. The earliest manuscript of the document is of the fourteenth century, so some historians believe it is likely a forgery.

The document titled Pacta conventa or Qualiter (the first word in the document) was found in a Trogir library. Until the 19th century it was considered that it dated to 1102. However, historians today hold that it is not an authentic document from 1102 and likely a forgery from the 14th century, but that the contents of the Pacta Conventa still correspond to the political situation of that time in Croatia. The document is preserved in the Hungarian National Museum in Budapest.

== Background ==
After Petar Snačić, the last Croatian king of Croat descent, was killed on the battlefield in 1097, the Croats had refused to surrender. To end the war, an agreement was made, probably in 1102. The Croatian nobles allegedly concluded the Pacta conventa with King Coloman before his crowning as the Croatian king in Biograd.

The Hungarian king offered "an agreement as pleases them" to the twelve noble Croatian tribes from the families of Čudomirić, Gusić, Kačić, Kukar, Jamomet, Lasničić, Lapčan and Karinjan, Mogorović, Poletčić, Snačić, Šubić, and Tugomirić.

== Terms ==
The agreement determined that the Croatian nobles who signed the document with King Coloman would retain their possessions and properties without interference. It also granted the mentioned families exemption from tax or tributes to the king. Each of the twelve noble Croatian tribes were obliged to answer the king's call if someone attacked his borders and send at least ten armed horsemen to war, as far as the Drava River (Croatia's northern boundary with Hungary) at their own expense. Beyond that point, the Hungarian king paid the expenses.

== Validity of the document itself ==
The document's validity is questionable. While some claim the earliest text concerning the alleged agreement came from the second half of the 14th century others call it a late medieval forgery, not a twelfth-century source. While various items of the text seem anachronistic to some, other historians say these could be reworkings of a text from an actual agreement.

Since the 19th century, a number of historians have claimed that the Pacta conventa was not a genuine document.

In 1915 and then also in 1925, Milan Šufflay mentioned the document in some of his works, first declaring it an outright forgery, and later saying it was a 14th-century "addendum" to the manuscript of Thomas the Archdeacon. Hungarian historian János Karácsonyi thought it was a 14th-century forgery, Slovene historian Ljudmil Hauptmann dated the document to the 13th century, Croatian historians Miho Barada and Marko Kostrenčić thought it was made in 1102, while later Croatian historian Nada Klaić thought it was a forgery probably made in the 14th century. Croatian historian Stjepan Antoljak in turn said the Pacta was an incomplete historical source, but not a forgery. Nada Klaić elaborated her "lack of opinion" over the matter of 1102 in a 1959 article disputing the Croatian writer Oleg Mandić's earlier work on the matter.

The dispute and uncertainty over the Pacta conventa matches the overall uncertainty and dispute over the relationship between the Croatian and Hungarian kingdoms in the 10th and 11th century, with Croatian historian Ferdo Šišić and his followers assuming Tomislav of Croatia had ruled most of the area inhabited by Croats, including Slavonia, while the Hungarian historians Gyula Kristó, Bálint Hóman and János Karácsonyi thought the area between Drava and Sava belonged neither to Croatia nor to Hungary at the time, an opinion that Nada Klaić said she would not preclude, because the generic name "Slavonia" (lit. the land of the Slavs) may have implied so.

Though the validity of the document is disputed, there was at least a non-written agreement that regulated the relations between Hungary and Croatia in approximately the same way, since from 1102 until 1918 kings of Hungary were also kings of Croatia, represented by a governor (ban), but Croatia kept its own parliament (Sabor) and considerable autonomy.

The source of inspiration for the text of the document must have been the political and social developments that had taken place over a 300-year period following 1102 when the two kingdoms united under the Hungarian king, either by the choice of the Croat nobility or by Hungarian force. The Croatian nobility retained its laws and privileges including the restriction of military service that they owed to the king within the boundaries of Croatia.

== Interpretations of the agreement ==
According to the Library of Congress country study on the former Yugoslavia, King Coloman crushed opposition after the death of Ladislaus I of Hungary and won the crown of Dalmatia and Croatia in 1102. The crowning of Coloman forged a link between the Croatian and Hungarian crowns that lasted until the end of World War I. Croatians have maintained for centuries that Croatia remained a sovereign state despite the voluntary union of the two crowns. A number of Hungarian historians also accept the view that Croatia and Hungary entered in a personal union in 1102 and that, whatever the authenticity of the Pacta conventa, the contents of it correspond to the reality of rule in Croatia. However, some Hungarian and Serbian historians claim that Hungary annexed Croatia outright in 1102. According to Frederick Bernard Singleton, the Croatians have always maintained that they were never legally part of Hungary. In the eyes of Croatians, Croatia was a separate state which happened to share a ruler with the Hungarians. The degree of Croatian autonomy fluctuated from time to time, as well as its borders. According to Daniel Power, Croatia became part of Hungary in the late 11th and early twelfth century. According to the country study on Hungary Croatia was never assimilated into Hungary; rather, it became an associate kingdom administered by a ban, or civil governor. In either case, Hungarian culture permeated Croatia, the Croatian-Hungarian border shifted often, and at times Hungary treated Croatia as a vassal state.

In 1105 Coloman granted privileges to maritime cities in exchange for their submission. These included the election of their own bishops and priors which is later only confirmed by the king, prohibition of Hungarians settling in towns. Also, the cities did not pay tribute, while royal agents supervised the collection of custom duties without interfering in local politics.

While Croatian historian Nada Klaić thinks that some sort of surrender occurred in 1102, giving the Croatians light terms, Slovenian historians Matjaž Klemenčič and Mitja Žagar believe the Pacta Conventa never actually existed, but the story about it was important to support the Croatian position later in the Habsburg monarchy as being a basis of their rights to statehood. Klemenčič and Žagar think that although Croatia ceased to exist as an independent state, the Croatian nobility retained relatively strong powers. Klaić thinks that the Trogir manuscript, the earliest text of the alleged pact, is not the text of that surrender, but describes contemporary relations between king and nobility and then traced that current 14th century reality back to an initial agreement.

== Later references ==
After the death of King Louis II at the Battle of Mohács in 1526, the Croatian parliament met at Cetin and elected Ferdinand of Austria king of Croatia. According to the Croatian historical narrative, the Croatian parliament took the opportunity in 1526 to reassert its autonomy from Hungary with the election of Ferdinand by the words:"...we joined the Holy Crown of Hungary by our own free will just as we do now, the rule of Your Majesty". Croatian historians also argue that the struggle for ascendancy to the Habsburg throne at this time provides evidence of Croatia's political autonomy. In the Croatian legal interpretation of the personal union, Louis II didn't leave any heirs and the legal carrier of the union (the king) didn't exist anymore so the right to elect the king belonged once more to the Croatian nobility. Unlike Hungarian historians, the Austrians never claimed they conquered Croatia by force and there appears to be little reason to doubt Croatian claims about the events of 1526.

The intro of The Hungaro-Croatian Compromise of 1868 (the Nagodba) starts as: "Since Croatia and Slavonia have alike de jure and de facto belonged for centuries to the Crown of St. Stephen..." Although the Nagodba provided a measure of political autonomy to Croatia-Slavonia, it was subordinated politically and economically to Budapest.
