= Župan =

European title of leadership

Župan (Serbo-Croatian pronunciation: [ʒǔpan]) is a noble and administrative title used in several states in Central and Southeastern Europe between the 7th century and the 21st century. It was (and in Croatia still is) the leader of the administrative unit župa (or županija). The term in turn was adopted by the Hungarians as ispán and spread further.

The word župan comes from Proto-Slavic word župa ("area, district"). Linguists trace župa back to the Proto-Indo-European root gewp-, meaning a cavity, depression, or pit (referring to a settlement nestled in a valley or low-lying area).

== Origin of the title ==
The exact origin of the title is not definitively known and there have been several hypotheses: Slavic (Franz Miklosich), Turkic-Avarian (A. Bruckner), Iranian (F. Altheim), Proto-Indo-European (V. Machek), Indo-European (D. Dragojević), Illyrian-Thracian (K. Oštir), Old-Balkan (M. Budimir), among others. Francis Dvornik considered it having an Indo-European or Iranian origin. There is no similar Proto-Slavic word, but the title was preserved primarily among the Slavic peoples and their neighbours who were under their influence.

The title origin is not necessarily related to the origin of the titleholder, and many scholars often considered it to be a title and institution the Slavs borrowed from the Pannonian Avars. This is argued in a viewpoint of an "image of an early Slavic society that initially was almost completely non-hierarchical". However, its presence among Pannonian Avars and in the Avar language is unconfirmed. Theories of an Avar connection are dismissed by some scholars due to the lack of evidence for the title's use by Avars, in addition to the term's occurrence in Slavic territories far beyond the area where the two groups co-existed. Toponyms which are etymologically related to the title župan include Županovo kolo in Novgorod, Russia, and Župany kolo in Ukraine. Following research by Ambroży Bogucki, Bohumil Vykypĕl and Georg Holzer, in 2007 Franjo Smiljanić excluded any Avar influence on the origin of the term. He concluded that remnants of Slavic tribal organization may have been preserved under Avar authority. With them agreed Andrej Pleterski in 2015.

=== Historical sources ===
In 2009, A. Alemany considered that the title *ču(b)-pān, often in a northeastern Iranian milieu, had an Eastern and Central Asian derivation, čupan, and a Western and European derivation, župan. The Eastern čupan first occurs, but allegedly as is usually connected with čupan, in a Bactrian contract dated to 588 AD, where are mentioned two "headman" (Bactrian: σωπανο, sōpano); among the Western Turks (582–657), the leader of the fifth Shunishi Duolu tribe was a chuban chuo (čupan čor), while the leader of the fifth Geshu Nushibi tribe was chuban sijin (čupan irkin), with chuo and sijin being the standard title of the each tribe's leader, inferior to qayan (khagan), but superior to bäg. However, there is no mention of čupan in Old Turkic runic inscriptions; a Chinese document (c. 8th century) near Kucha mentions several persons (allegedly Tocharians) with patronymic Bai and title chuban; in the same century, in the Chinese documents of province Khotan are mentioned word chiban and alleged title of low rank chaupam; the first (Old) Turkic document recording the title čupan is a Uyghur decree from Turpan dated c. 9th–11th century. According to the work Dīwānu l-Luġat al-Turk by the 11th century scholar Mahmud al-Kashgari, a čupan is an assistant to a village headman.

The first certain mention of Western župan occurs in a charter of Kremsmünster abbey, by Bavarian duke Tassilo III in 777 AD, in which the monastery was granted by a group of Slavs, headed by the chieftains Taliup and Sparuna, whose abode lied beneath the boundaries reported under oath by the iopan Physso (according to Otto Kronsteiner originally named Pribislav, or a non-Slavic name; as a Slavic leader, or probably wrongly as an Avar dignitary); the zo(ō)apan of Buyla inscription on a buckled bowl of a heterogeneous and chronologically uncertain (7th or 8th century) Treasure of Nagyszentmiklós; the supan in Lusatian and Latin language (7th century): the ζουπανος (zoupanos) on a silver bowl found at Veliki Preslav, capital of First Bulgarian Empire (893–972), and zhupan in Greek stone inscriptions and Cyrillic alphabet (Codex Suprasliensis); the zuppanis in Latin charter of St. George's church at Putalj by Croatian duke Trpimir in 852 AD; the Slavic, generally considered of White Croats, title of king's deputy mentioned by Ibn Rusta in the 10th century, the sūt.ğ or sūb.ğ, of which corrupted text some transcribe as sūbanğ (or Turkic sū beḫ); according to Constantine VII in his 10th century work De Administrando Imperio, Croats, Serbs and other Slavic nations of Dalmatia had the ζουπάνους (zoupanous), "Princes, as they say, these nations had none, but only župans, elders, as is the rule in the other Slavonic regions"; also the Croatian state was divided in 11 ζουπανίας (zoupanias) administrative regions, with additional three ruled by βοάνος (boanos) or μπάνος (b/mpanos) (Ban); and is individually mentioned ζουπανου (zoupanou) Beloje of Travunia; later among Serbs it also temporary became a title for supreme leader ζουπανος μεγας (zoupanos megas, Grand Župan); in Czech sources supani (1187).

=== Etymology ===
The title's origin remains uncertain, with majority of scholars considering Iranian etymology:

- Franz Altheim derived the title from Iranian etymon *fsu-pāna- that evolved to šuβān in Parthian, šupān and šubān in Persian; all these words meaning "shepherd". Gerhard Doerfer suggested possible Iranian origin for Mahmud al-Kashgari's čupan linking it with New Persian čōpan, a variant form of šubān, with usual change of š- to č-. Omeljan Pritsak in Iranian *fsu-pāna saw "shepherd of (human) cattle" in Avar service, using the Slavic masses as cannon fodder. Some scholars derived it from alleged Old Iranian ašurpan/aszurpan, meaning "great lord, noblemen". It may be traced to the Slavic and Iranian cultural interactions in Eastern and Southeastern Europe in the first centuries AD.
- Karl Brugmann derived the Common Slavic *županъ from župa "district, small administrative region", < *geupā, comparing this word with Skt. gopā- (herdsman, guardian), derived from gopaya (to guard, protect), of gup-, or even go-pā (cow-herd), Avestan gufra- (deep, hidden), among others. Oleg Trubachyov derived it from *gupana (from gopaya, the guard of cattle). Karl Heinrich Menges considered župan to be a slavicized form of Altaic čupan (which itself was a loanword from Iranian), with modified meaning from "clan, community" to "district".
- According to Alemany, the (Old) Turkic ču(b) was likely borrowed from Khotanese -cū and Chinese zhou (prefecture), which was a Chinese territorial administration applied to Central Asian regions inhabited by Iranians, but it has even older meaning of small island; a township unit; a region, up to zhoumu (regional governor) from Han to Sui dynasty. Alemany stated that, as there were settlements of Central Asian Iranians at least in some of those zhou, the title čupan as *ču(b)-pān (protecting a ču(b) or zhou), was an Iranian rendering (see marz-bān, "protecting the marches"), of the Chinese zhoumu. The suffix -pān (from Avestan and Old Persian pat, "protector"; pā-, "to protect, to care") is well documented in Manichean Parthian texts from Turpan, and lesser extent in Sogdian and Khotanese. He concluded that the title meant both regio and rector, and if čupan is a loanword mediated by Avars (instead of derived from a common Slavic word župa), the association could explain the proposed shift č- > ž- in župan.
- András Róna-Tas argued against Turkic origin of župan (due to initial /zh/ from choban). Eugene Helimski proposed its Tungusic language origin, which was rejected by Marcel Erdal whose supporting Iranian origin.

== Usage of the title and division ==
The title had a widespread distribution, and did not always have a concrete institutional definition. Slavic tribes were divided into fraternities, each including a certain number of families. The territory inhabited by a tribe was a župa, and its leader was the župan.

In Belarusian, Czech, Polish, Slovak and Ukrainian allegedly from župan was shortened to pan, meaning "master, mister, sir".

=== Bulgaria ===
The župans, once as kopan, of the First Bulgarian Empire are traditionally seen as Slavic chiefs, or leaders of a local tribe and district.

One of the first dated writings of župan as a title was found in Preslav, the capital of the First Bulgarian Empire from 893. It was placed on a silver cup unearthed during archaeological excavations in Veliki Preslav, Bulgaria and dated from the reign of Kniaz Boris I (852–889, 893). The inscription is in Meideval Greek language, but contains the words "Greek: ζουπανος μεγας", apparently as a title of the cup owner Sivin. The Christian blessing "May God help" is inscribed in smaller typeface in the margin above the main inscription, and leads the researchers to conclude it was later addition, added after the suppression of the Vladimir-Rasate rebellion in 893. If true, it dates the main inscription with bigger letters to the pagan period, either before Baptism of Bulgaria in 864 or before 893 at the latest.

One earlier inscription shows župan as an attribute to another title tarkhan by using the combined form "ζουπαν ταρκανοσ". The stone inscription was found in Pliska and is dated to 822 AD during the reign of Omurtag (814 - 831). The title was bear by some Ohsun Kirigir (Οχσουνοσ Κυριγηρ), a courtier of the khan.

=== Bosnia ===
Similarly to Serbia and Croatia, Bosnian rulers of the early Middle Ages were referred to as župan. According to Fine, the governorship was hereditary, and the župan reported to a ban or a king, whom they were obliged to aid in war.

=== Croatia ===
As heads of the županija, the most important role of the župans were their public authority function. They were the primates populi, nobile aristocracy from where the king (or duke) recruited the official servants. Those župans by origin most probably belonged to the tribal or noble family structure, in historiography known as the Twelve noble tribes of Croatia, which are mentioned in the Pacta conventa and Supetar Cartulary. In the Supetar Cartulary, and in Croatian redaction of Chronicle of the Priest of Duklja, they were called as nobile sapienciroes and starac (elderman), indicating that to the agreement with king Coloman went twelve "elders župan".

According to the charter by Croatian duke Muncimir (892 AD) it can be identified various official functions; župans who work at the ducal palace (Budimiro zuppani palatii, Prisna maccererarii, Pruade zuppano cauallario, Zelestro zuppano camerario, Zestededo zuppano pincernario, Bolledrago zuppano carnicario, Budimiro zuppano comitisse, Augina zuppano armigeri), who are part of territorial organization (Zelllerico zuppano Cleoniae, Sibidrago zuppano Clesae), or are only noble by position (Petro zuppano, Pribritreco filius Petri zuppano). The župans were usually listed in historical documents only as witnesses, without mark of duty.

The transition of 12th to the 13th century is characterized by terminological change of the title župan and the spreading beyond the tribal main territory. The older social rank of the župan (iupanus) in Latin documents was changed with the title comes. The Latin term comes in the 14th and 15th century Croatia was translated in two different ways, as špan and knez. The first signified the royal official in the županija, while the second the hereditary lord of the županija exempted from the direct royal rule. Thus the term lost its old tribal and got a new administrative meaning, while the old Croatian tribes (genus) under the title of knez preserved the inheritance rights over the lands of županija.

=== Hungary ===
There were several "ispán"'s in the royal court of Hungarian Kingdom: 'nádorispán' (palatine), 'udvarispán' (court ispán), 'kápolna ispán' (chapel ispán), and 'ispán's of the financial hierarchy ('harmincadispán', 'pénzverőispán', 'sókamaraispán', 'urburaispán'). Similarly the leaders of the ethnic groups were called 'ispán' like 'besenyők ispánja' (Besermian ispán) 'székelyispán' (Szekler ispán).

=== Serbia ===
According to Fine, the governorship was hereditary, and the župan reported to the Serbian prince, whom they were obliged to aid in war. The earlier župan title was abolished and replaced with the Greek-derived kefalija (kephale, "head, master").

=== Slovakia ===
The title župan is widely used as an informal name for presidents of self-governing regions (župa) in Slovakia.

=== Slovenia ===
In Slovenia, župan is the official title of the mayor of the 212 municipalities. In the Slovene-speaking municipalities in Italy, the term županstvo is used for the municipal administration (similar to the Spanish ayuntamiento), while in Slovenia, this usage is obsolete. Before the 19th century, župan was used as a name for the village elder. With the introduction of modern municipal administration in the Austrian Empire in 1849, it became the official Slovene title for mayors.

The Slovene name for parishes, župnija, has the same etymology. The parish priest is called župnik.

The name županija is used to refer to the counties of Hungary (the term has been historically used by the Prekmurje Slovenes, who were part of the Kingdom of Hungary from the 10th century until 1918).

== See also ==
- Grand Župan, a Bulgarian and Serbian medieval title (equivalent to Grand Prince)
- Gespan
- Ban
- Župa

== Sources ==
- Alemany, Agustí (2009). "From Central Asia to the Balkans: the title *ču(b)-pān". In Allison, Christine; Joisten-Pruschke, Anke; Wendtland, Antje (eds.). Daēnā to Dîn: Religion, Kultur und Sprache in der iranischen Welt. Otto Harrassowitz Verlag. pp. 3–12. ISBN 978-344705917-6.
- Anderson, Perry (1996) [First published by New Left Books 1974]. Passages from Antiquity to Feudalism. London; New York: Verso. ISBN 1-85984-107-4.
- Bechcicki, Jerzy (2006). "O Problematici Etnogeneze Bijele Hrvatske" [On the issue of ethno-genesis of the White Croatia]. In Nosić, Milan (ed.). Bijeli Hrvati I [White Croats I] (in Croatian). Rijeka: Maveda. pp. 8–9. ISBN 953-7029-04-2.
- Biliarsky, Ivan (2011). Word and Power in Mediaeval Bulgaria. Brill. p. 368. ISBN 978-900419145-7.
- Brückner, Alexander (1908). "Über Etymologische Anarchie". Indogermanische Forschungen (in German). 23: 206–219. doi:10.1515/if-1909-0118. S2CID 202507000.
- Brugmann, Karl (1900). "Aksl. župa 'Bezirk'". Indogermanische Forschungen (in German). 11: 111–112. doi:10.1515/9783110242539.111. S2CID 170500221.
- Curta, Florin (2006). Southeastern Europe in the Middle Ages, 500-1250. Cambridge University Press. p. 164. ISBN 978-052181539-0 – via Internet Archive.
- Dvornik, Francis (1949). The Making of Central and Eastern Europe. London: Polish Research Centre Ltd.
- Dvornik, Francis (1956). The Slavs: Their Early History and Civilization. Boston: American Academy of Arts and Sciences.
- Francis Dvornik; Romilly Jenkins; Bernard Lewis; Gyula Moravcsik; Dimitri Obolensky; Steven Runciman (1962). Jenkins, Romilly (ed.). De Administrando Imperio: Volume II Commentary. London: The Athlone Press, University of London. ISBN 978-0-88402-021-9.
- Engel, Pal; Róna-Tas, András (1994). "ispán" [Encyclopedia of Early Hungarian History, 9th—14th centuries]. Korai magyar történeti lexikon: 9-14. század (in Hungarian). Budapest: Akadémiai Kiadó. pp. 312–313. ISBN 963-05-6722-9.
- Erdal, Marcel (1988). "The Turkic Nagy-Szent-Miklós inscription in Greek letters". Acta Orientalia Academiae Scientiarum Hungaricae. 42: 221–234.
- Evans, Arthur (2007). Through Bosnia and the Herzegovina on Foot During the Insurrection, August and September 1875. Cosimo. ISBN 978-1-60206-270-2.
- Fine, John Van Antwerp (1991). The Early Medieval Balkans: A Critical Survey from the Sixth to the Late Twelfth Century. Michigan: University of Michigan Press. ISBN 0-472-08149-7.
- Fine, John Van Antwerp (1994), The Late Medieval Balkans: A Critical Survey from the Late Twelfth Century to the Ottoman Conquest, University of Michigan Press, ISBN 978-0-472-08260-5
- Gluhak, Alemko (1990), Porijeklo imena Hrvat [Origin of the name Croat] (in Croatian), Zagreb, Čakovec: Alemko Gluhak
- Gluhak, Alemko (1993), Hrvatski etimološki rječnik [Croatian etymological dictionary] (in Croatian), Zagreb: August Cesarec, ISBN 953-162-000-8
- Golden, Peter Benjamin (2012), Oq and Oğur~Oğuz* (PDF), Turkish and Middle Eastern Studies, Rutgers University, footnote 37, archived from the original (PDF) on 19 April 2015
- Karbić, Damir (2004). "Šubići Bribirski do gubitka nasljedne banske časti (1322.)" [The Šubići of Bribir until the Loss of the Hereditary Position of the Croatian Ban (1322)] (PDF). Papers and Proceedings of the Department of Historical Research of the Institute of Historical and Social Research of Croatian Academy of Sciences and Arts (Zbornik Odsjeka za povijesne znanosti Zavoda za povijesne i društvene znanosti Hrvatske akademije znanosti i umjetnosti) (in Croatian). 22. Croatian Academy of Sciences and Arts: 5.
- Kmietowicz, Frank A. (1976). Ancient Slavs. Worzalla Pub. Co. pp. 185, footnote.
- Majorov, Aleksandr Vjačeslavovič (2012). Velika Hrvatska: etnogeneza i rana povijest Slavena prikarpatskoga područja [Great Croatia: ethnogenesis and early history of Slavs in the Carpathian area] (in Croatian). Zagreb, Samobor: Brethren of the Croatian Dragon, Meridijani. pp. 95, 92–95. ISBN 978-953-6928-26-2.
- Mühle, Eduard (2023). Slavs in the Middle Ages between Idea and Reality. Leiden: Brill. ISBN 9789004536746.
- Petkov, Kiril (2008). The Voices of Medieval Bulgaria, Seventh-Fifteenth Century: The Records of a Bygone Culture. Brill. pp. 9–10, 37–38, 448, 508. ISBN 978-900416831-2.
- Pleterski, Andrej (2015). "Ранние славяне в Восточных Альпах и на соседних землях" [The Early Slavs in the Eastern Alps and Their Periphery]. Stratum Plus (in Russian) (5): 227–248.
- Şirin, Hatice (2014). "Čolpan 'The Planet Venus' in Turkic". Studia Etymologica Cracoviensia. 19 (3): 169–178. doi:10.4467/20843836SE.14.010.1653.
- Smiljanić, Franjo (2007), "O položaju i funkciji župana u hrvatskim srednjovjekovnim vrelima od 9. do 16. stoljeća" [On the position and function of župan in Croatian historical sources from 9th until 16th century], Povijesni prilozi (in Croatian), 33 (33)
- Štih, Peter (1995). "Novi pokušaji rješavanja problematike Hrvata u Karantaniji" [New attempts to resolve the problems of Croats in Karantania]. In Budak, Neven (ed.). Etnogeneza Hrvata [Ethnogenesis of Croats] (in Croatian). Matica hrvatska. ISBN 953-6014-45-9.
- Štih, Peter (2010). The Middle Ages between the Eastern Alps and the Northern Adriatic: Select Papers on Slovene Historiography and Medieval History. Leiden, Boston: Brill. ISBN 9789004187702.
- Tomović, G. (1999). "Župa i Župan". Leksikon srpskog srednjeg veka [Lexicon of the Serbian Middle Ages] (in Bosnian). Belgrade: Knowledge. pp. 195–198.
- Trubachyov, Oleg (1965). "To the Question of Slavic-Iranian Language Connections". V. Stetsyuk.
- The Yugoslav village. Dept. of Rural Sociology. 1972. p. 39.
- Živković, Tibor (2012). De conversione Croatorum et Serborum: A Lost Source. Belgrade: The Institute of History.
