= Croatian nobility =

Privileged social class in ancient and medieval Croatia

Croatian nobility (Croatian: plemstvo, lit. 'vlastelin'; French: la noblesse) was a privileged social class in Croatia during the Antiquity and Medieval periods of the country's history. Noble families in the Kingdom of Croatia included high ranking populates from Slavonia, Dalmatia, Istria, and Republic of Ragusa.

Members belonged to an elite social hierarchy, normally placed immediately behind blood royalty, that possessed considerably more privileges or eminence than most other classes in a society. Membership thereof typically was often hereditary. Historically, membership in the nobility and the prerogatives thereof have been regulated or acknowledged by the monarch. Acquisition of sufficient power, wealth, military prowess or royal favour enabled commoners to ascend into the nobility. The country's royalty was heavily influenced by France's nobility resulting members of the Royal Courts to assume French titles and practices during French occupation. The controversial assumption of French practices contributed to wide spread political and social elitism among the nobles and monarch. The nobility regarded the peasant class as an unseen and irrelevant substrata of people which lead to high causality revolts and beheadings as well as sporadic periods of intense domestic violence.

Croatian Kings and Queen consorts often established duchies culminating in the Duchy of Croatia. Dukes or Duchesses were to rule a large territories within the Kingdom. Under the rule of the country's first King, Croatia became one of the most powerful kingdoms in the Balkans. Nobles possessed unprecedented power over the governed, and were one of the first members of royalty to advocate for monarchical absolutism. Many nobles were charged with the administration of numerous territories and at the height of the Kingdom's power royals ruled nearly eleven separate countries and dozens of extended domains.

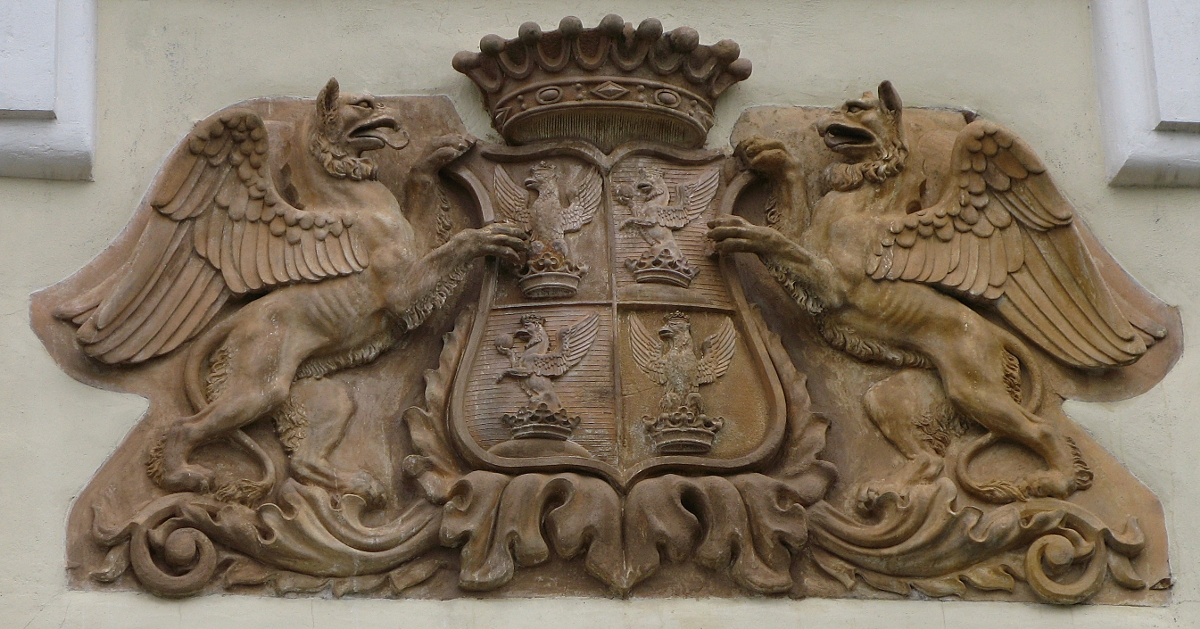
Coat of Arms with two gryphons on the Draskovic Family's personal residence at Trakoscan Castle (18th century?)

== History ==
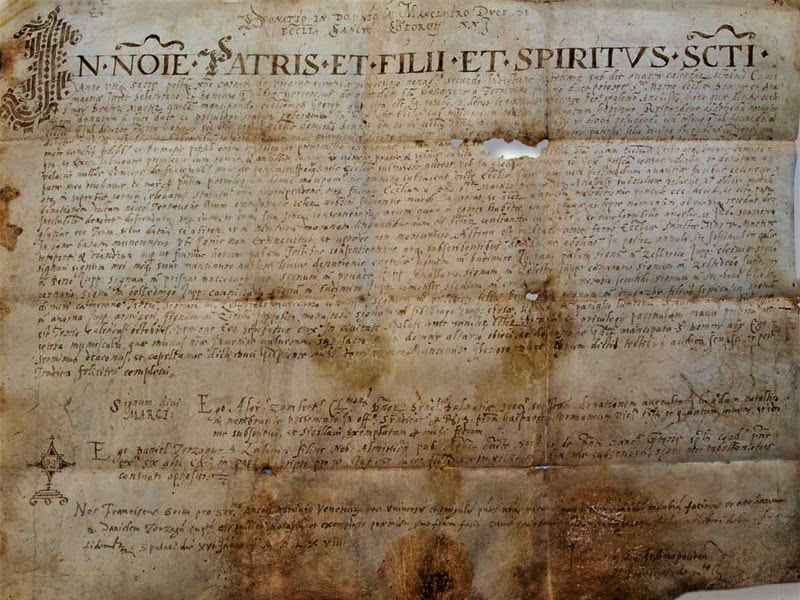
Duke Muncimir's Latin charter from 892 (transcript, 18th century?): divino munere Croatorum dux ("By God's grace, Duke of the Croats").

Croatia was elevated to the status of Kingdom around 925, and the notions of nobility quickly followed. The nobility of the continental and island states of Croatia played a major role in shaping the history of the country, although in the present day even hereditary peers have no special rights, privileges or responsibilities, except for special designations who are accorded limited rights. Select members of select noble families are given the right to an audience with the prime minister. Tomislav was the first Croatian ruler whom the Papal chancellery honored with the title "king". The king was granted the right to award titles to high-ranking members of society and direct blood descendants.

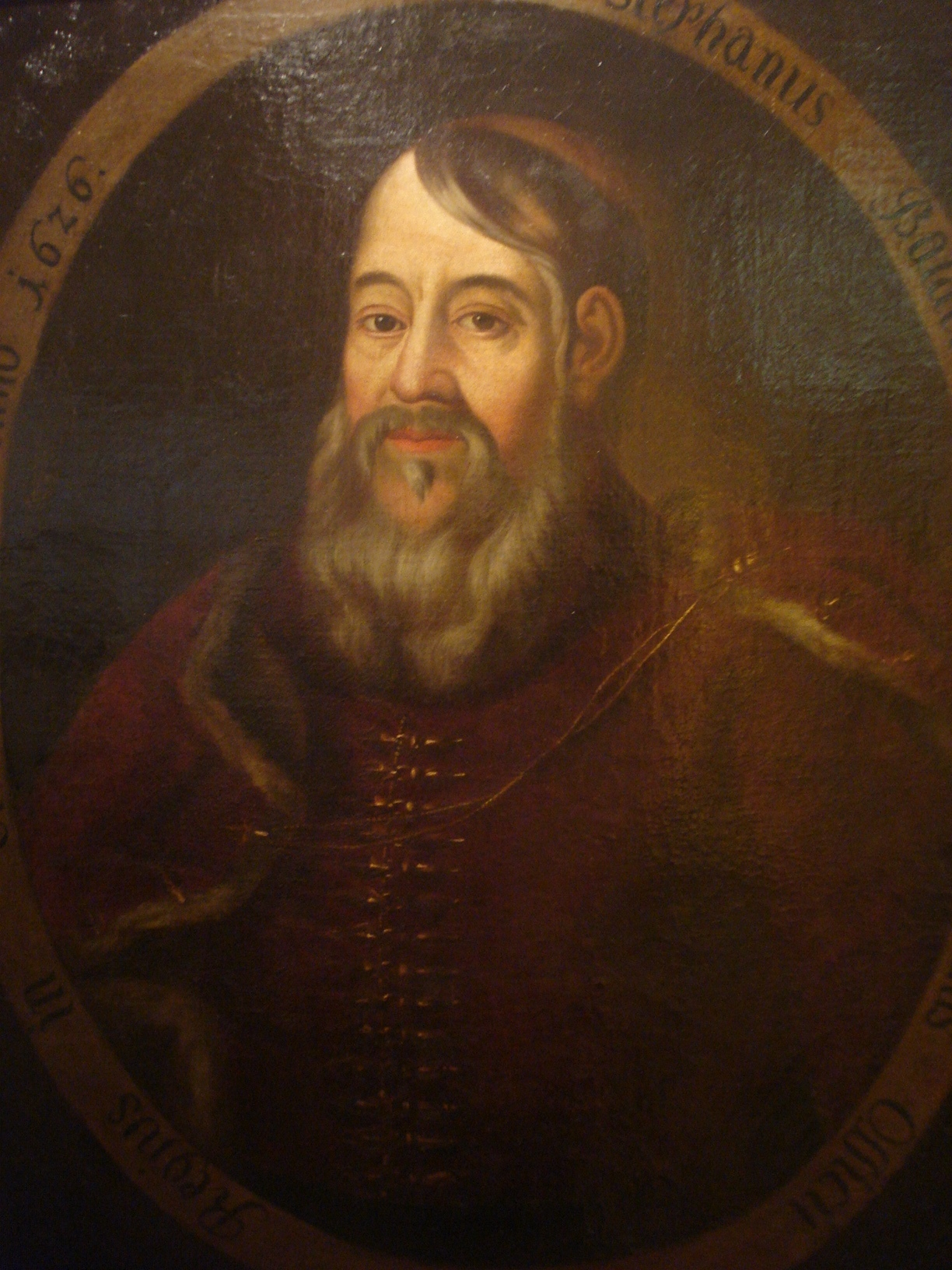
Stjepan Patačić, protonotary of the Kingdom of Slavonia and Deputy Ban (Viceroy)

Sometime between 923 and 928, Tomislav succeeded in uniting the Croats of Pannonia and Dalmatia, each of which had been ruled separately by dukes, thus furthering the Croatian nobility and its primary interests. The nobles of Croatia, at the time, administered a group of eleven counties (županije) and one banate. Each of these regions had a fortified royal town administered by a member of the royal court charged by a noble.

Croatian society underwent major changes in the 10th century. Local leaders, the župani, were replaced by the retainers of the king, who took land from the previous landowners, essentially creating a feudal system. The previously free peasants became serfs and ceased being soldiers, causing the military power of Croatia to fade and the noble class to assume more wealth. The rule of Krešimir's son Miroslav was marked by a gradual weakening of Croatia, and thus the powers of the nobility. Nobility marked their divine right to rule through intense violence that included setting entire villages on fire to reinforce fighting "fire with fire".

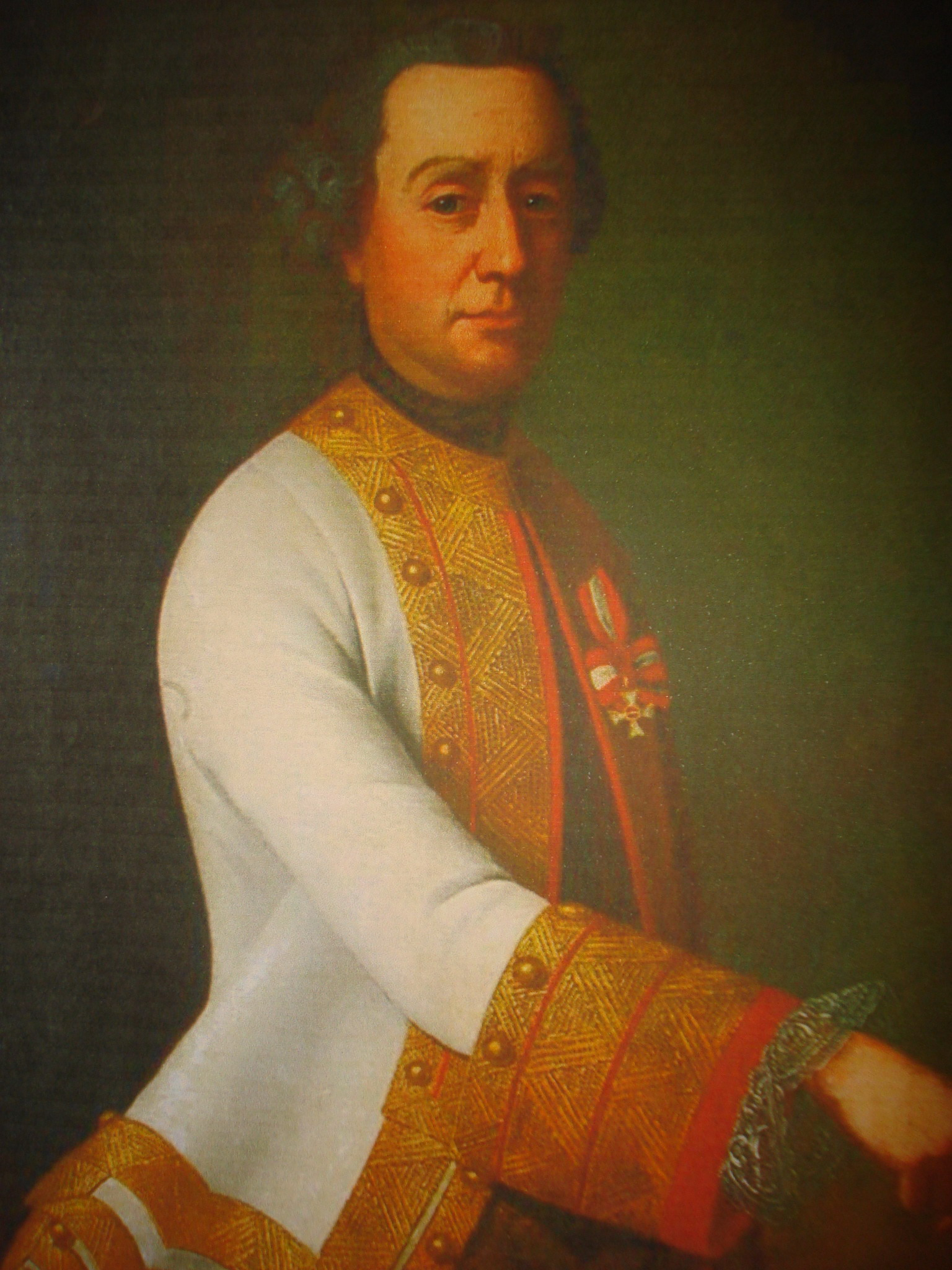
Count Josip Kazimir Drašković, general of the Habsburg monarchy imperial army

As soon as Stjepan Držislav had died in 997, his three sons, Svetoslav (997–1000), Krešimir III (1000–1030), and Gojslav (1000–1020), opened a violent contest for the throne, weakening the state dramatically. Each of the three brothers already firmly placed in the upper tier of the country's nobility required more power than was allocated to them. All three of them took hold of the armies under their jurisdiction and began to fight the armies of one another until Gojslav and Krešimir III decided to rule concurrently, with the third taking control of the Duchy of Croatia. During the reign of Peter Krešimir IV (1058–1074), the medieval Croatian kingdom reached its territorial peak and more land then ever was disseminated to the noble families. However, Krešimir managed to get the Byzantine Empire to confirm him as the supreme ruler of the Theme of Dalmatia; this further restricted the powers of the dukes and duchesses. During this time nobles advocated for the Roman curia to become more involved in the religious affairs of Croatia, which consolidated the monarchical power but disrupted his rule over the Glagolitic clergy in parts of Istria after 1060. Croatia under the at-the-time set up was composed of twelve counties and was slightly larger than in the previous kingdom. It included the closest southern Dalmatian duchy of Pagania, and its influence extended over Zahumlje, Travunia, and Duklja. As a result of this Dukedom was an increasingly popular designation by the monarch.

After the 1089 revolt there was no permanent state capital, as the royal residence varied was partially destroyed and now varied from one ruler to another; five cities in total reportedly obtained the title of a royal seat: Nin (Krešimir IV), Biograd (Stephen Držislav, Krešimir IV), Knin (Zvonimir, Petar Svačić), Šibenik (Krešimir IV), and Solin (Krešimir II).

According to the Supetar Cartulary, a new king was elected by select members of the nobility which included seven bans: ban of Croatia, ban of Bosnia, ban of Slavonia etc. The bans were elected by the first six Croatian tribes, while the other six were responsible for choosing župans (see Twelve noble tribes of Croatia). In this time the noble titles in Croatia were made analogous to those used in other parts of Europe at the time, with comes and baron used for the župani and the royal court nobles, and vlastelin for the noblemen.

== Lifestyle ==
Ban of Croatia
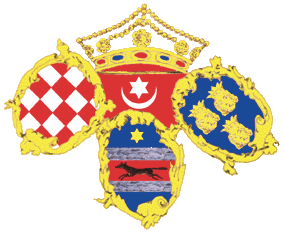
- The heraldic standard of the Croatian ban in the 19th century
- Reports to: King of Croatia; Croatian Parliament
- Seat: Banski dvori, Zagreb, Croatia
- Inaugural holder: Pribina
- Formation: 10th century

=== Privileges ===
Usually the nobility's privileges were granted or recognized by the monarch in association with possession of a specific title, office or estate. Most nobles' wealth derived from one or more estates, large or small, that might include fields, pasture, orchards, timberland, hunting grounds, streams, etc. It also included infrastructure such as castle, well and mill to which local peasants were allowed some access, although often at a price. The nobility held many political positions, such as a Banship, and received many career promotions, especially in the military, at court and often in the higher functions in the government and judiciary.

=== Economic status ===
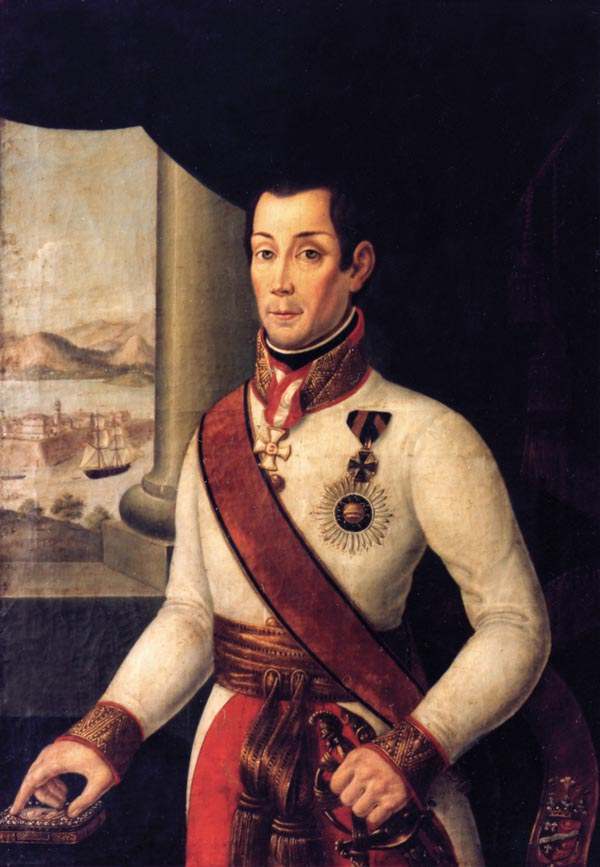
Baron Franjo Ksaver Tomašić, third general of the Habsburg Monarchy

Economic analysis of nobility in Croatian realms showcase various financial statuses that were almost always dramatically bigger than the governed populate. The upper tiers of nobility controlled over 90% of wealth in the country which often caused riots and tensions between the peasant class and elite class.

=== Characteristics ===
==== Divine justification ====
The noble and wealthy classes of the Croatian aristocracy had certain characteristics both directly and indirectly tied with their station in society. Many of the lavish practices of the nobility was influenced by the Roman noble practices. Its practices were not seen as vain or pretentious, but as a divine imperative to the aristocratic strata. Nobles were required to be "generous" and "magnanimous", to perform great deeds with a certain level of disinterest.

==== Etiquette ====
A noble's status in the royal court required appropriate and conspicuous consumption; a strict etiquette was required by: a word or glance from the king could make or destroy a career. Nobles often went into debt themselves to build prestigious urban mansions and to buy clothes, paintings, silverware, dishes, and other furnishings befitting their rank. They were also required to show liberality by hosting sumptuous parties and by funding the arts. Nobles were expected to live "nobly", that is, from the proceeds of these possessions. Any work that involved manual labor was avoided and prohibited.

==== Views toward the poor ====
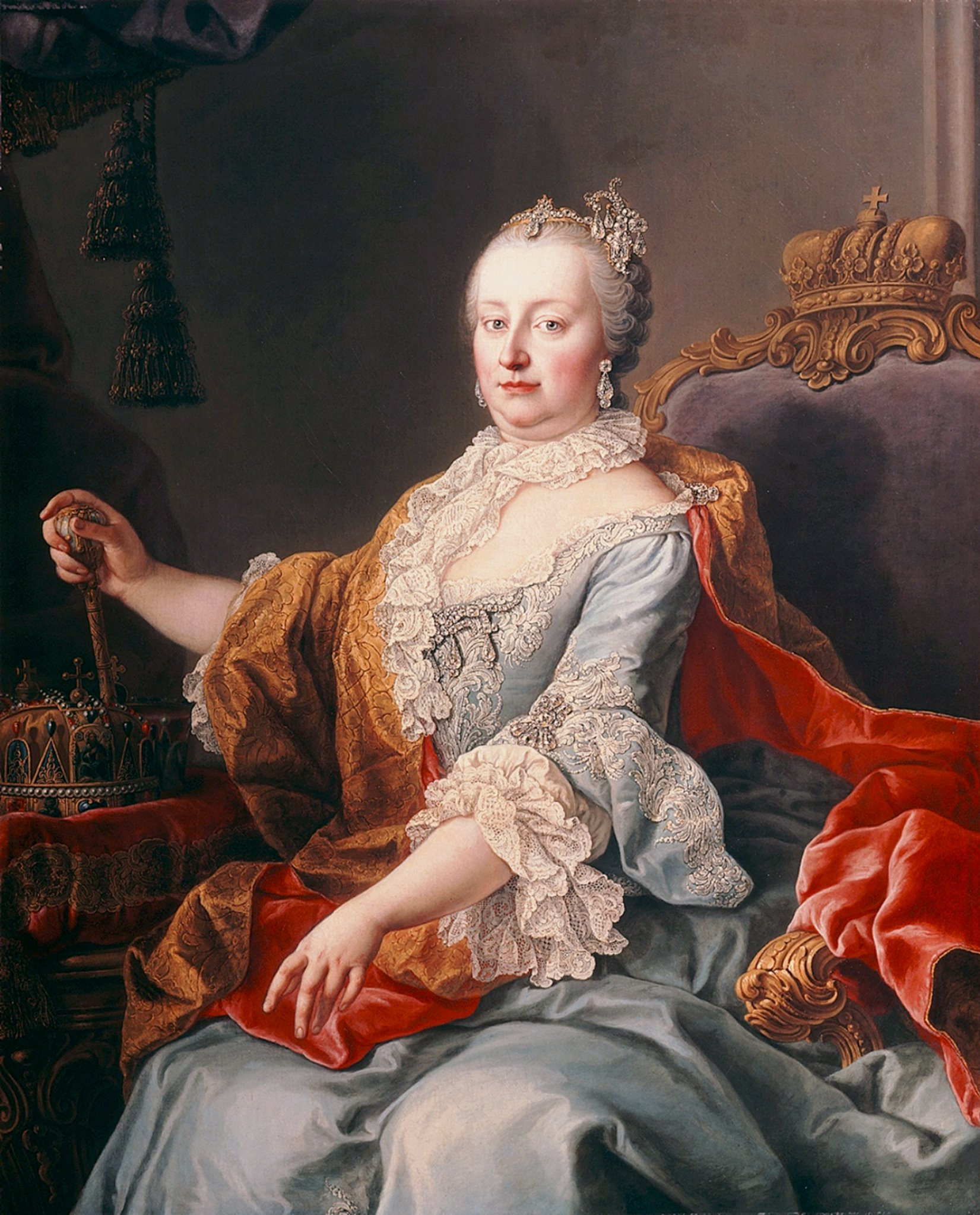
First an Archduchess of Austria, Maria Theresa later ascended to the throne, assuming a long list of titles that included Croatia.

The nobles classes originally started asserting their divine right to rule by assuming a saviors complex and spent much time guiding the poor and underprivileged "into the light" of their societal beckoning. However, over time and with the introduction of the French and their occupancy of Croatian high court, nobles began to view the poor as an inferior subset of people that were to remain voiceless and devout to their King. It was through this mechanism, the nobility, that the wealthier caste of people advocated for one of the first iterations of monarchical absolutism, and required unquestioning loyalty and understanding from their subjects. With a tightened grip on the commoners, many nobles' personal agendas were issued through the people with land, statues, and buildings being commissioned under their name. The poor were via High Order, not allowed to look or speak to any member of the nobility and could be put to death or beheaded if one were to speak during a ceremony or formal occasion.

The controversial assumption of French practices contributed to wide spread political and social elitism among the nobles and monarch. The nobility regarded the peasant class as an unseen and irrelevant substrata of people which lead to high causality revolts and beheadings as well as sporadic periods of intense domestic violence. For example, during King Demetrius Zvonimir reign, he was murdered after guards over took him during the 1089 revolts and threw him off his balcony into a "bed of fire". The death was especially symbolic as the nobility of the kingdom often burned revolutionaries alive to assert their divine supremacy. However, the country's nobles were so infuriated by such an act of defiance and commanded the Royal Croatian Forces to spear to death hundreds of peasants who participated in the raiding of the King's Palace and their bodies were hung on the houses of their families.

== Forms of address ==
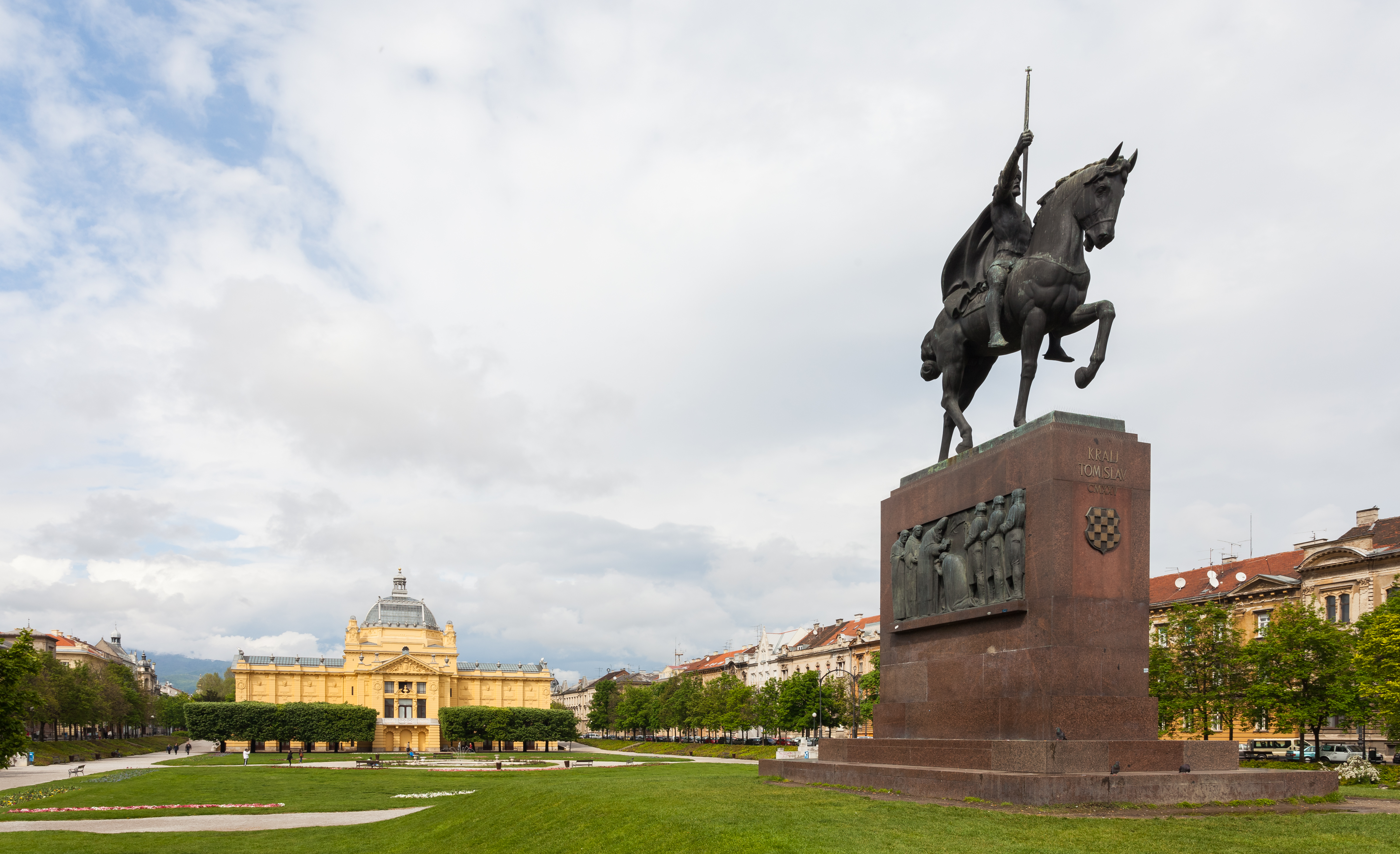
A monument commemorating King Tomislav in the country's capital city, Zagreb.

=== Noble origins ===
Croatian nobility, similar to English and French nobility, originated from feudalism. The relationships between monarchs and their warriors produced nobility because the rulers would promise the warriors land in exchange for protection of the country. From this derived the Hrvatski plemićki zbor (Croatian Nobility Assembly) which is the only association of living descendants from Croatian nobility.

Due to the fact that the Croatian nobility was unable to secure an heir, in 1102 the Hungarian king was granted the throne of Croatia by treaty. Thus Croatia entered in union with Hungary, until 1918 kings of Hungary were also kings of Croatia, represented by a governor (ban), but Croatia kept its own parliament (Sabor) and considerable autonomy. Throughout this time period Croatian nobles kept the various titles described above.

Between 1941 and 1943, King Tomislav II of the Independent State of Croatia granted about 60 titles of duke, marquess, count, viscount and baron but mostly to non-citizens.

=== Titles ===
Croatian nobility titles mostly were granted by the kings of Croatia, later kings of Hungary-Croatia. In Dalmatia and Istria several Venetian titles were granted and during the French occupation, French titles were granted and practices were assumed. Following the collapse of Austria-Hungary following World War I, the Kingdom of Serbs, Croats, and Slovenes (later Yugoslavia) stopped giving hereditary titles.

Between 925 and 1102, the Kingdom of Croatia's nobility had various titles and forms of address that varied from region to region and position to position. The King of Croatia was afforded the right of choosing his royal handle, for example in 1941, Prince Adimone, Duke of Aosta, took the name of King Tomislav II upon his succession to the Croatian throne. Titles were exclusive to members of the King's High Court and included the Queen consort and the following:

1. Duke (the highest ranking a noble could receive in his majesty's court)
2. Marquess (a lineage rank through European peerage)
3. Count (a successive rank to the Marquess)
4. Baron (title of honor bestowed to a civilian whose actions warranted the title)

The titles were usually followed by the full name or more commonly by their surname. The title of a duke is the highest of the nobility. A marquess is a nobleman of hereditary rank in various European peerages and in those of some of their former colonies. A count is a title in European countries for a noble of varying status, but historically deemed to convey an approximate rank intermediate between the highest and lowest titles of nobility. A baron is a title of honour, often hereditary, and ranked as one of the lowest titles in the nobility system. A viscount is a member of the nobility whose comital title ranks usually, as in the British peerage, below an earl or a count (the earl's continental equivalent) and above a baron.

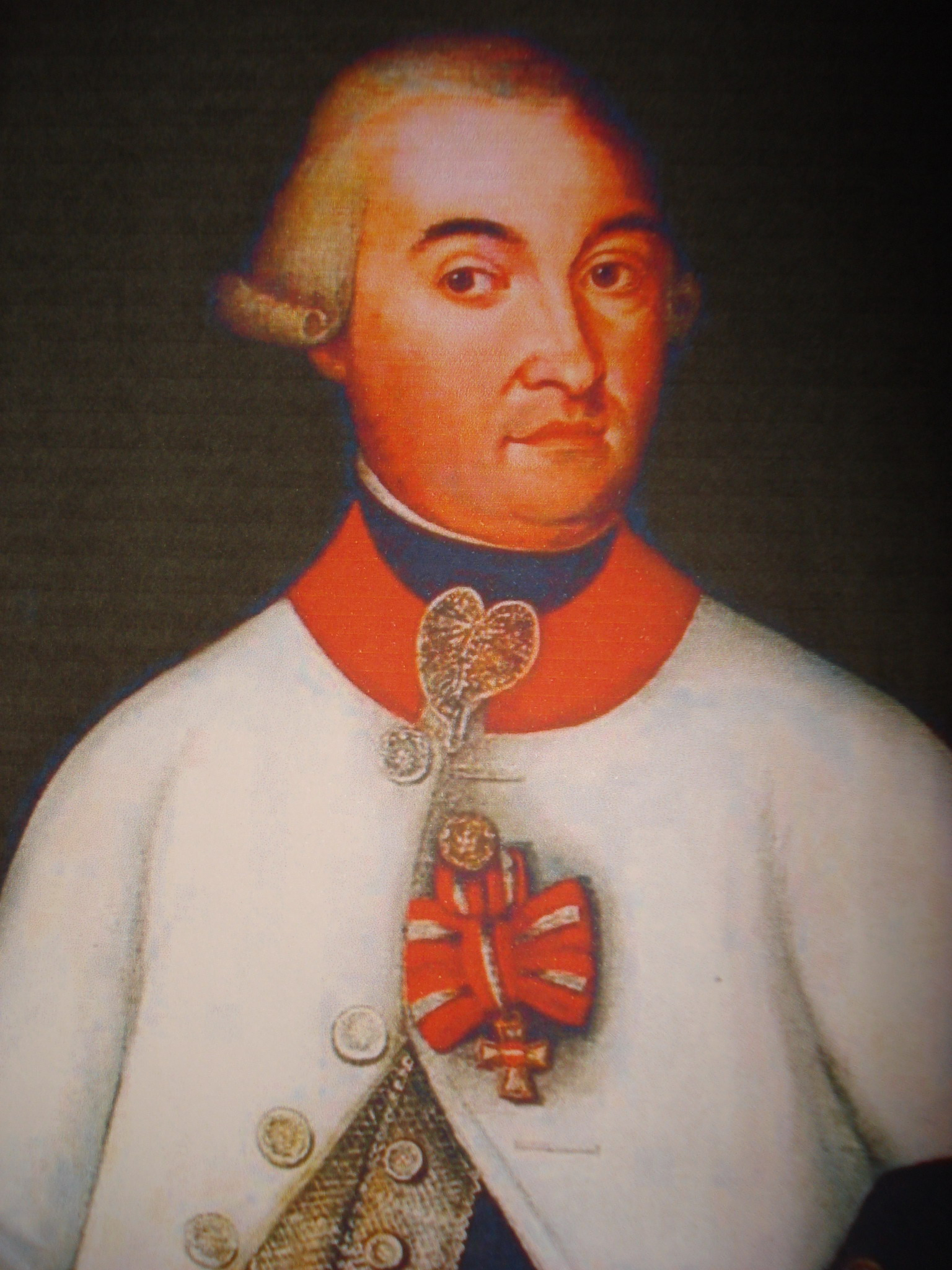
Adam Franjo Burić, a Croatian nobleman

There were multiple types of titles used by Croatian nobles that stemmed from France: some were personal ranks and others were linked to the fiefs owned, called fiefs de dignité or kraljevski posjed.

1. Duc: possessor of a duchy (duché—a feudal property, not an independent principality) and recognition as duke by the king.
2. Prince: possessor of a lordship styled a principality (principauté); most such titles were held by family tradition and were treated by the court as titres de courtoisie—often borne by the eldest sons of the more important duke-peers. This title of prince is not to be confused with the rank of prince, borne by the princes du sang, the princes légitimés or the princes étrangers whose high precedence derived from their kinship to actual rulers.
3. Marquis: possessor of a marquessate (marquisat), but often assumed by a noble family as a titre de courtoisie
4. Comte: possessor of a county (comté) or self-assumed.
5. Vicomte: possessor of a viscounty (vicomté) or self-assumed.
6. Baron: possessor of a barony (baronnie) or self-assumed.

== Symbols ==
The Kingdom of Croatia and its nobles had many symbols, emblems and coat of arms. The seals and coats were often used as parts of clothing, shields, castles, and other objects associated with noble families.

| First known example of Croatian chequy as depicted in Innsbruck, Austria (1495) | Coat of arms of Croatia used in 1527 as part of a seal on the Cetingrad Charter | Kingdom of Croatia (1525–1868) | Coat of arms of Croatian Crown land (until 1868) |
| Kingdom of Croatia-Slavonia (1868–1918). The official version had St. Stephen's crown due to Croatia being part of Lands of the Crown of Saint Stephen. | Coat of arms of Transleithania (1868–1915) | Patriotic badge from 1914 | Lesser Coat of arms of Transleithania (1915–1918) |
| Common coat of arms of Austria-Hungary (1915–1918) | Kingdom of Yugoslavia (1918–1943) | Banovina of Croatia (1939–1943) | Banovina of Croatia, greater version (1939–1943) |

== Families ==
Coat of arms of the House of Habsburg. The Habsburgs ruled the Kingdom of Croatia for just under 470 years, longer than any other dynasty

Dukes/Princes

- Domagojević
- Feštetić
- Gorjanski
- Kačić
- Karlović
- Lacković
- Novosel
- Mlinarić
- Odescalchi
- Šubić
- Zrinski

Marquesses

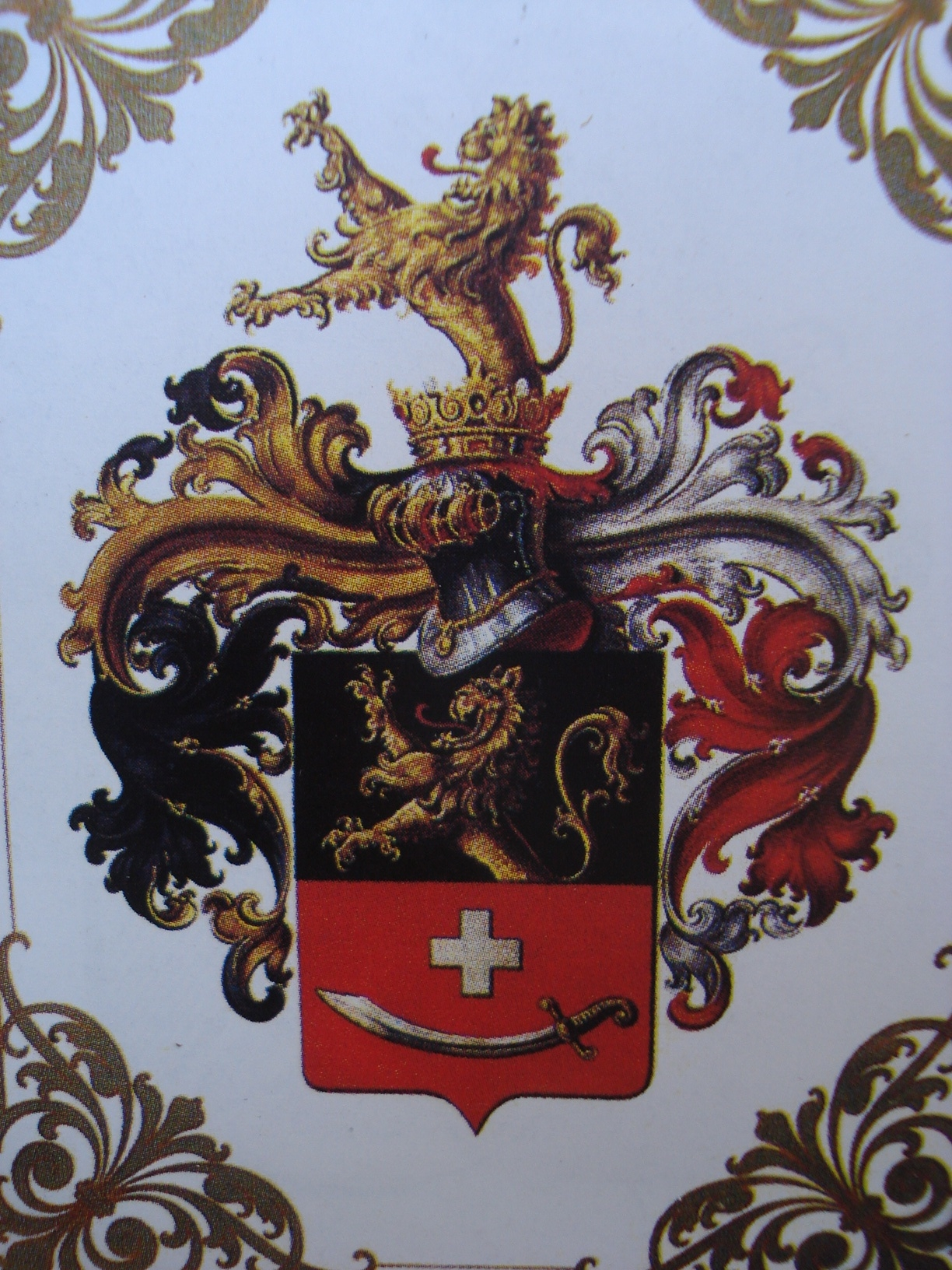
Coat of arms of the Rukavina (of Klanačko polje) noble family, Croatia

- Frankopan (Frankapan)
- Bombelles
- Bunić
- Sponheim
- Andechs

Counts

The seal of the Kingdom of Croatia and Dalmatia was affixed in 1527 to the Cetin Charter that confirmed the Habsburg to be the rulers of Croatia

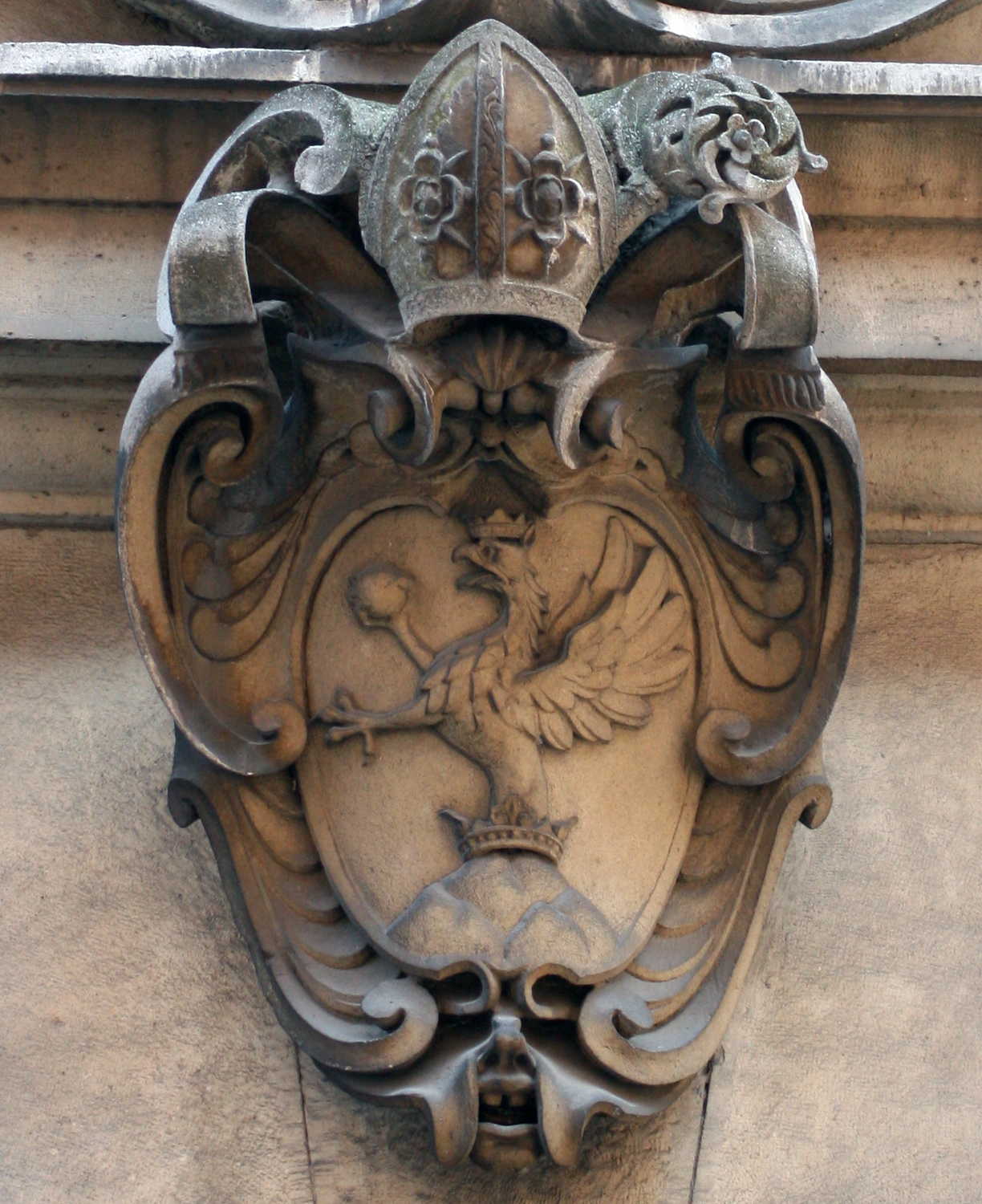
Bratislava Kapitulská ruling family

- Bondić
- Crnković
- Delišimunović
- Drašković
- Erdődy
- Gundulić
- Gučetić
- Gradić
- Jelačić
- Kabužić
- Keglević
- Pejačević
- Pucić (de Zagorie)
- Sorkočević

Barons

- Banffy
- Cseszneky
- Gutmann
- Knežević
- Turković
- Vranyczany-Dobrinović

== See also ==
- List of noble families of Croatia in alphabetical order
- Twelve noble tribes of Croatia
- Kingdom of Croatia (Habsburg)
- Kingdom of Croatia-Slavonia
- History of Croatia
- Pacta conventa (Croatia)
- Crown of Zvonimir
- Bans of Croatia
- Timeline of Croatian history
