= Simon Kacsics =

Hungarian nobleman

Ban of Slavonia alongside Michael Kacsics
- Reign: 1212
- Predecessor: Berthold of Merania
- Successor: Martin Hont-Pázmány
- Died: after 1228
- Noble family: gens Kacsics
- Issue: John I Simon II a daughter

Simon from the kindred Kacsics (Hungarian: Kacsics nembeli Simon, Croatian: Šimun Kačić; died after 1228) was a Hungarian distinguished nobleman from the gens Kacsics (Kačić). He was one of the leading instigators of Queen Gertrude's assassination in September 1213.

== Origin ==
His only known brother was Michael Kacsics, Voivode of Transylvania (1209–1212) and Ban of Slavonia in 1212. As Michael and Simon suddenly appeared in Hungarian contemporary sources without genealogical antecedents, several scholars, including Croatian historian Ivan Majnarić considered their kindred may have been descendants of the Omiš Kačić family, one of the Croatian "twelve noble tribes" described in the Pacta conventa and Supetar Cartulary. The brothers were first mentioned in the early 13th century, they possessed villages in Nógrád County, for instance Salgó and Hollókő. Majnarić argued the Kacsics brothers may have belonged to supporters of Duke Andrew in his rebellion against the elder brother and then king Emeric. Following the coronation of Andrew II in 1205, the brothers were probably gifted with estates in Hungary, establishing a new branch within the clan, which now became part of the Hungarian nobility. A relationship between Hungarian and Omiš Kačićs is identified primarily in the mention of Šimun Kačić in a document from 1178, with father Nikola and brother Jakov, and with brothers Borislav, Bogdan and other family members in a document from 1190. This source possibly reflects to Simon Kacsics.

Earlier historical works considered that his father-in-law was the powerful baron Bánk Bár-Kalán, who served as Palatine of Hungary from 1212 to 1213. However Bánk's son-in-law, a certain Simon, who was mentioned by a royal charter of Stephen V from 1270, and who possibly also participated in the murder of Queen Gertrude, died without descendants. Simon Kacsics and his unidentified wife had two sons, John I and Simon II, and a daughter who became a nun. Historian János Karácsonyi considered the Salgói (or Salgay) noble family originated from Simon II, but Pál Engel improved the data and linked the family to other namesake member of the Kacsics kinship. In fact, Simon's branch remained marginal and died out shortly after 1299.

== Career ==
Simon was appointed Ban of Slavonia in 1212, holding the dignity alongside his brother. A royal charter from 1228 confirmed that Simon, along with Peter, son of Töre, played a decisive role in the murder of Queen Gertrude of Merania in September 1213. His brother, Michael and Palatine Bánk Bár-Kalán probably also took part in the preparation of the assassination. After the return of Andrew II of Hungary from Halychina, only Peter was executed by impalement, the Kacsics clan could retain their estates and influence yet, due to political circumstances and the King's lack of internal support.

As he owned estates in Transylvania, historians Majnarić and Tamás Körmendi considered, Simon Kacsics was identical with that Simon, who served as ispán (comes) of Szabolcs County and Master of the stewards (magister dapiferorum) in 1214. Following that this Simon was mentioned as Voivode of Transylvania in 1215. Later he functioned as ispán of Szatmár County in 1221.

Béla, who long opposed his father's "useless and superfluous perpetual grants", was made Duke of Transylvania in 1226. He started reclaiming King Andrew's land grants throughout the country in 1228. He forced his father to confiscate the estates of those noblemen who had plotted against his mother one and a half decade earlier. Accordingly, Simon lost his lands and villages in Transylvania, including Marosvécs Castle (today in Brâncovenești, Romania), Széplak and Gyeke in Kolozs County (present-day Goreni and Geaca in Romania, respectively) and plausibly the lordship of Losonc in Nógrád County (today Lučenec, Slovakia), which were granted by Denis Tomaj and his clan (ancestors of the Bánffy de Losonc family). In his charter, Andrew referred to Simon's active participation in the murder of his consort. The land confiscation in 1228 might be a sign of the subsequent retaliation after an increased role in national politics by princes Béla and Coloman since the early 1220s, as historian Gyula Pauler argued.

Historian Tamás Körmendi argued, it is quite unrealistic that Andrew II appointed Simon to baronial dignities after the murder, even his few opportunities for punish the perpetrators, as Pauler had claimed. Accordingly, Simon was not considered among the assassins of Gertrude immediately after the murder. As Simon was mentioned as armed participant in the act, it is presumable that he became a victim of power intrigues and accused of conspiracy purely out of political reasons. Although, Simon did not longer hold any offices after 1221, he probably remained influential due to his extensive possession of Széplak, which covered the region of Szászrégen (today Reghin, Romania) to the Halychinan border, which could cause a political showdown.

== Sources ==
- Körmendi, Tamás (2014). "A Gertrúd királyné elleni merénylet körülményei [The Circumstances of the Murder of Queen Gertrude]". In Majorossy, Judit (ed.). Egy történelmi gyilkosság margójára. Merániai Gertrúd emlékezete, 1213–2013 (in Hungarian). Ferenczy Museum, Szentendre. pp. 95–124. ISBN 978-963-9590-77-9.
- Majnarić, Ivan (2009), "Prilog diskusiji o genealoškoj svezi omiških i ugarskih Kačića" [A Contribution to the Discussion Regarding Genealogical Connections between the Kačići (Kacsics) of Hungary and the Kačići of Omiš], Papers and Proceedings of the Department of Historical Research of the Institute of Historical and Social Research of the Croatian Academy of Sciences and Arts (in Croatian), 26: 49–58, ISSN 1330-7134 – via Hrčak
- Markó, László (2006). A magyar állam főméltóságai Szent Istvántól napjainkig: Életrajzi Lexikon [Great Officers of State in Hungary from King Saint Stephen to Our Days: A Biographical Encyclopedia] (in Hungarian). Helikon Kiadó. ISBN 963-208-970-7.
- Zsoldos, Attila (2011). Magyarország világi archontológiája, 1000–1301 [Secular Archontology of Hungary, 1000–1301] (in Hungarian). História, MTA Történettudományi Intézete. ISBN 978-963-9627-38-3.

Simon I Genus Kacsics Born: ? Died: after 1228
Political offices
Preceded by Berthold of Merania	Ban of Slavonia alongside Michael Kacsics; 1212	Succeeded by Martin Hont-Pázmány
Preceded by (?) Gabriel	Master of the stewards 1214	Succeeded by Demetrius Csák
Preceded by Julius Kán	Voivode of Transylvania; 1215	Succeeded by Ipoch Bogátradvány
