= Kemény Castle (Brâncovenești) =

Coordinates: 46.8612°N 24.7671°E

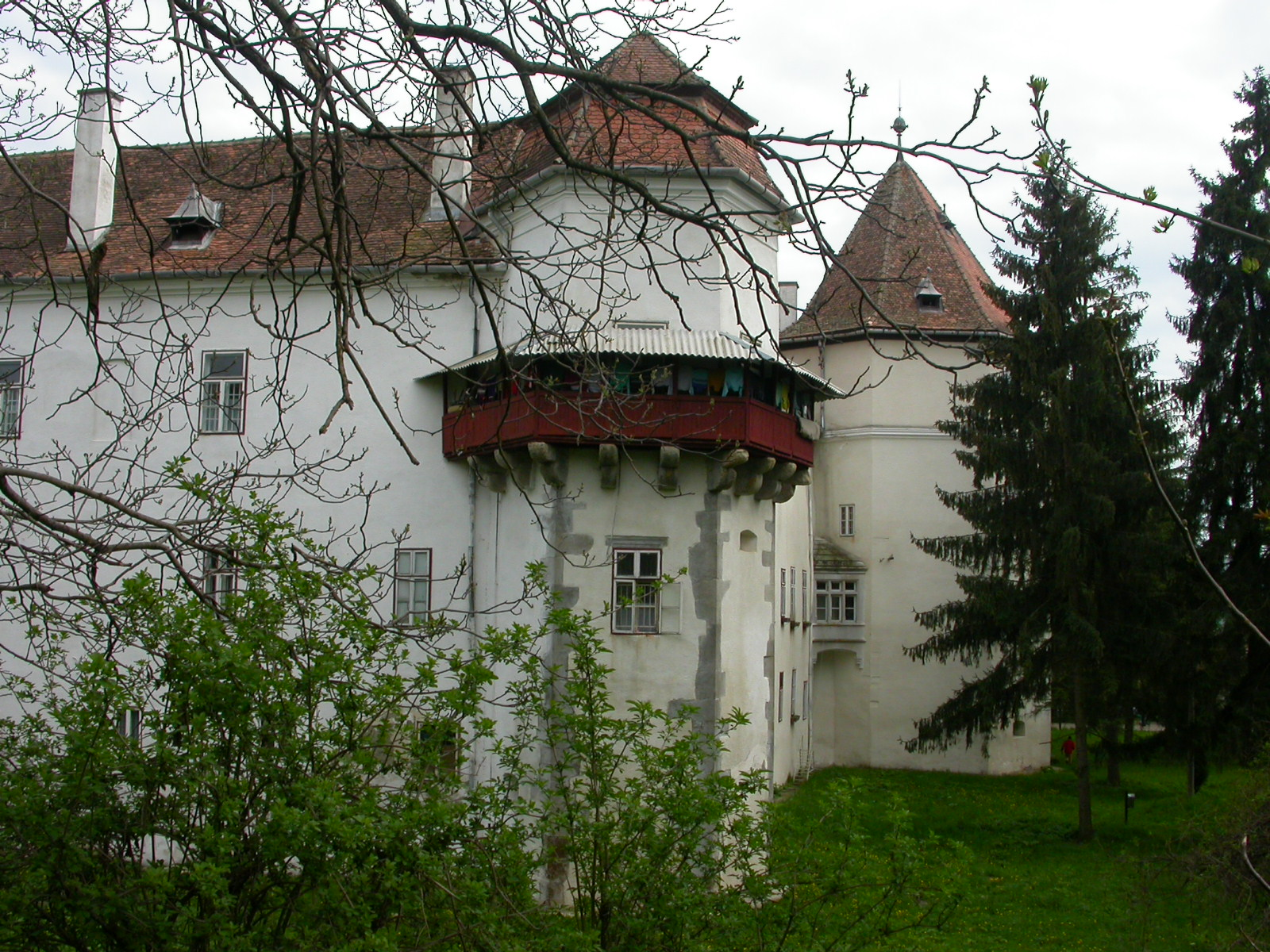
- Kemény Castle, Brâncovenești

General information
- Architectural style: Renaissance architecture
- Location: Brâncovenești, Romania
- Owner: John Kemény

Kemény Castle (Romanian: Castelul Kemény; Hungarian: Kemény-kastély; German: Kemény Schloss), situated at the foot of the Călimani Mountains on the right bank of the Mureș River in Brâncovenești (Hungarian: Marosvécs or Vécs), Mureș County, Romania, is one of the finest examples of Hungarian Renaissance architecture in Transylvania. It was built using the stones of a Roman fortification from the adjoining orchard.

The castle is one of the attractions of the Via Transilvanica long-distance trail, which passes through Brâncovenești.

== History ==
The first written mention of Brâncovenești was almost eight centuries ago. In this village on the right bank of the Mureş River, the Romans built a small fort on a hilltop, which was destroyed during the Migrations. Its name according to inscribed stones which were found in the ground was Ala Nova Illyricorum (Illyria#Roman rule for "the New Illyrian Wing"). Its few remnants can be seen in the current castle's former orchard.

The castle was built from Roman stones at the beginning of the 13th century, when the territory belonged to the Kingdom of Hungary. The earliest remaining document dates back to 1228, when King Andrew II of Hungary took it from Simon Kacsics and gave it to Denis Tomaj, and gives its name as castrum Wecheu. The ancestors of the Bánffy de Losoncz noble family inherited from them and held it for one and a half centuries. In 1467, the family took part in the failed rebellion against King Matthias, and thereby they lost their possession. The king gave it to one of his relatives from Hunyad County, John Ongor. It subsequently became the property of the wealthy and influential Michael Szobi. After his death, John Szapolyai gave all the Szobi properties to Stephen Werbőczy.

In the following years the castle changed hands many times. The sequence began with Ferenc Kendi, one of the leading figures of the time, then Sigismund Báthory left it to his uncle, Bocskai István. Around 1612 the castle became the property of István Wesselényi. The castle was also owned by Gabriel Bethlen, who passed it on to Peter Bethlen, but after his death it went to George I Rákóczi. In that period, the castle owned seven villages: Brȋncoveneşti, Săcalu de Pădure, Luieriu, Vătava, Ideciu de Jos si Ideciu de Sus, Cuieșd, and one part of Suseni. George I Rákóczi meant to give the castle to John Kemény, but only his son George II Rákóczi managed to do it. On 28 November 1648 the castle together with five villages was donated to John Kemény and his descendants. From this moment Brȋncoveneşti became John Kemény's property for three hundred years. From the summer of 1926 on, writers of the "Erdélyi Helikon" had their annual meeting in the Castle. At the end of World War II the local population completely ransacked the building, all the valuables were taken. Following its earlier nationalization, it became a reformatory, and it was then converted into a home for women and children with disabilities. As a result, the building was not open for a long time.

On 8 November 2014, the Kemény Castle from Brâncovenești was opened for visitors. Once again, the property has been returned to the Kemény family after a period of 70 years.

== Description ==
The castle has a square-shaped plan, courtyard and corner towers, two larger and two smaller. Several windows have frames in Renaissance style. Built above the entrance is a picturesque stone balcony on consoles. The consoles can be seen at the floors of the towers. The entrance is on the north side, on a bridge over the outside ditch of the castle. Old documents show that the former citadel (13th century) was protected by moats, walls and towers positioned below the plateau on which the castle was built. These were destroyed during post-war reconstruction work.

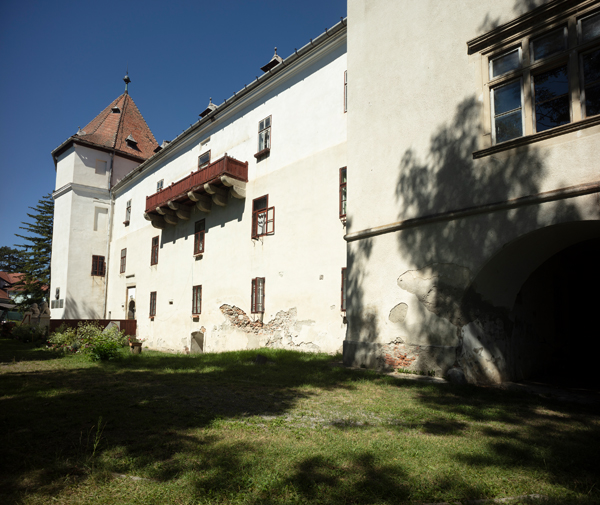

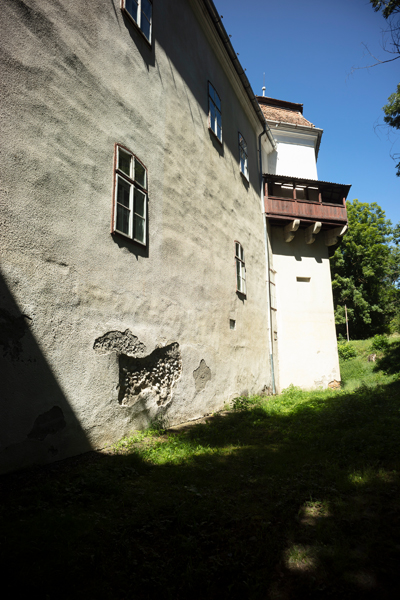

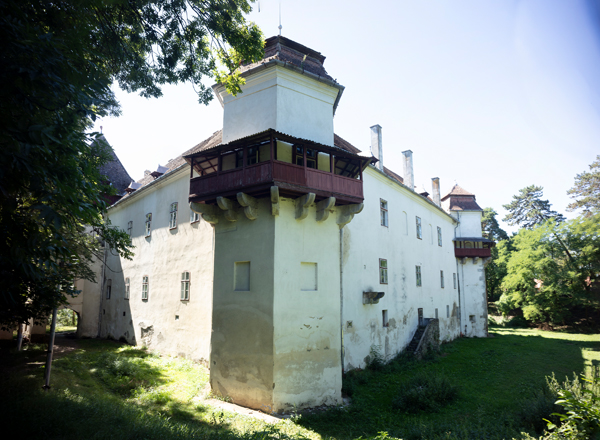

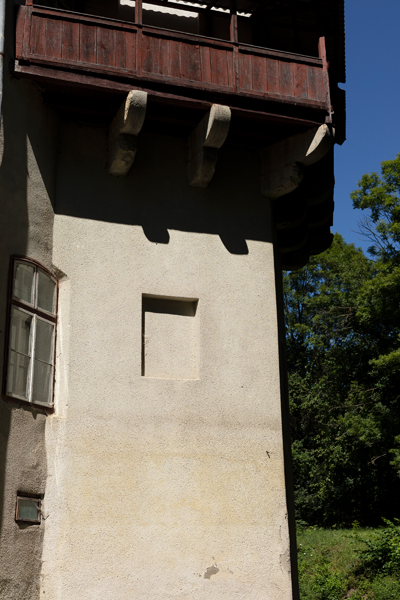

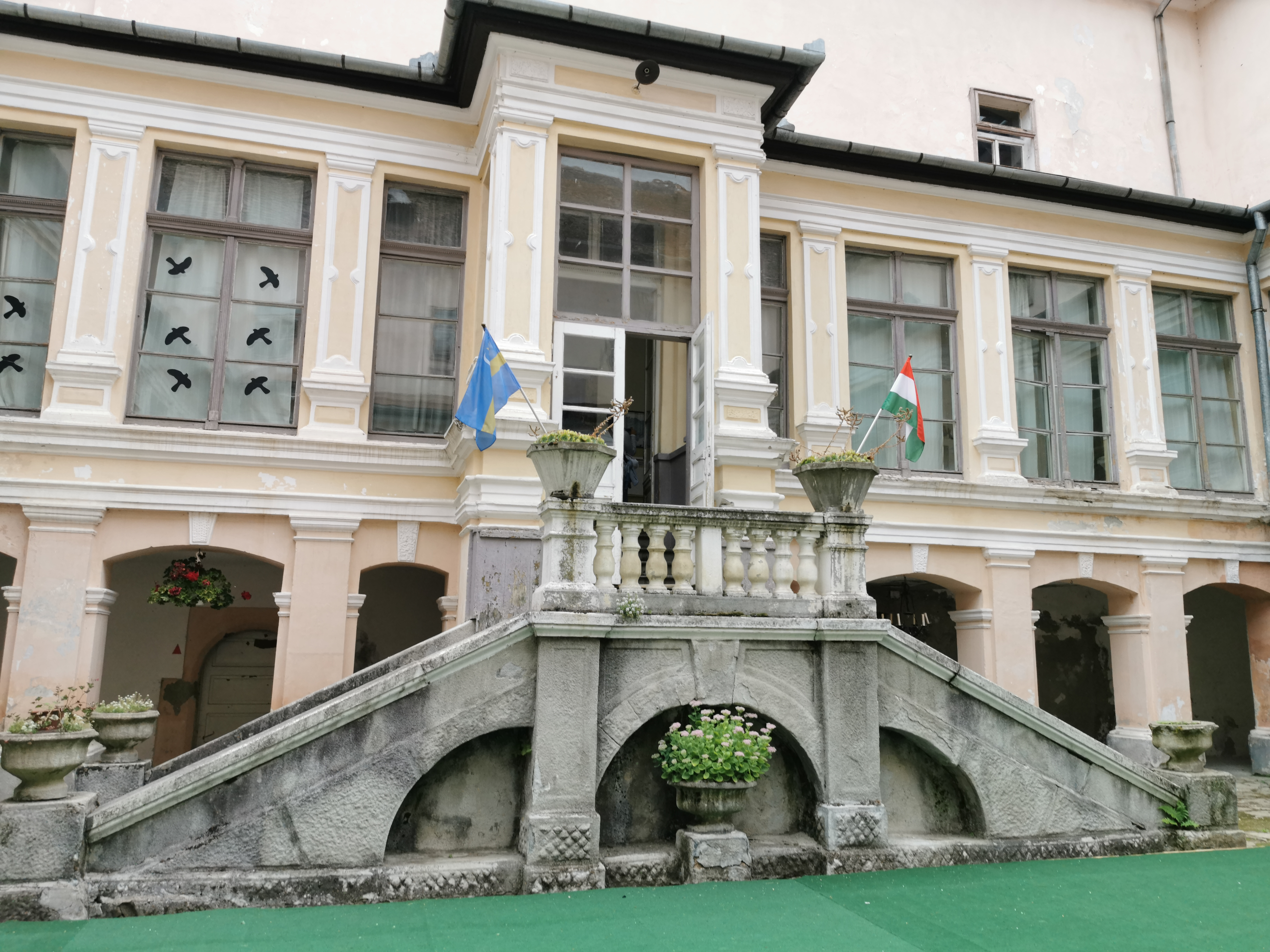

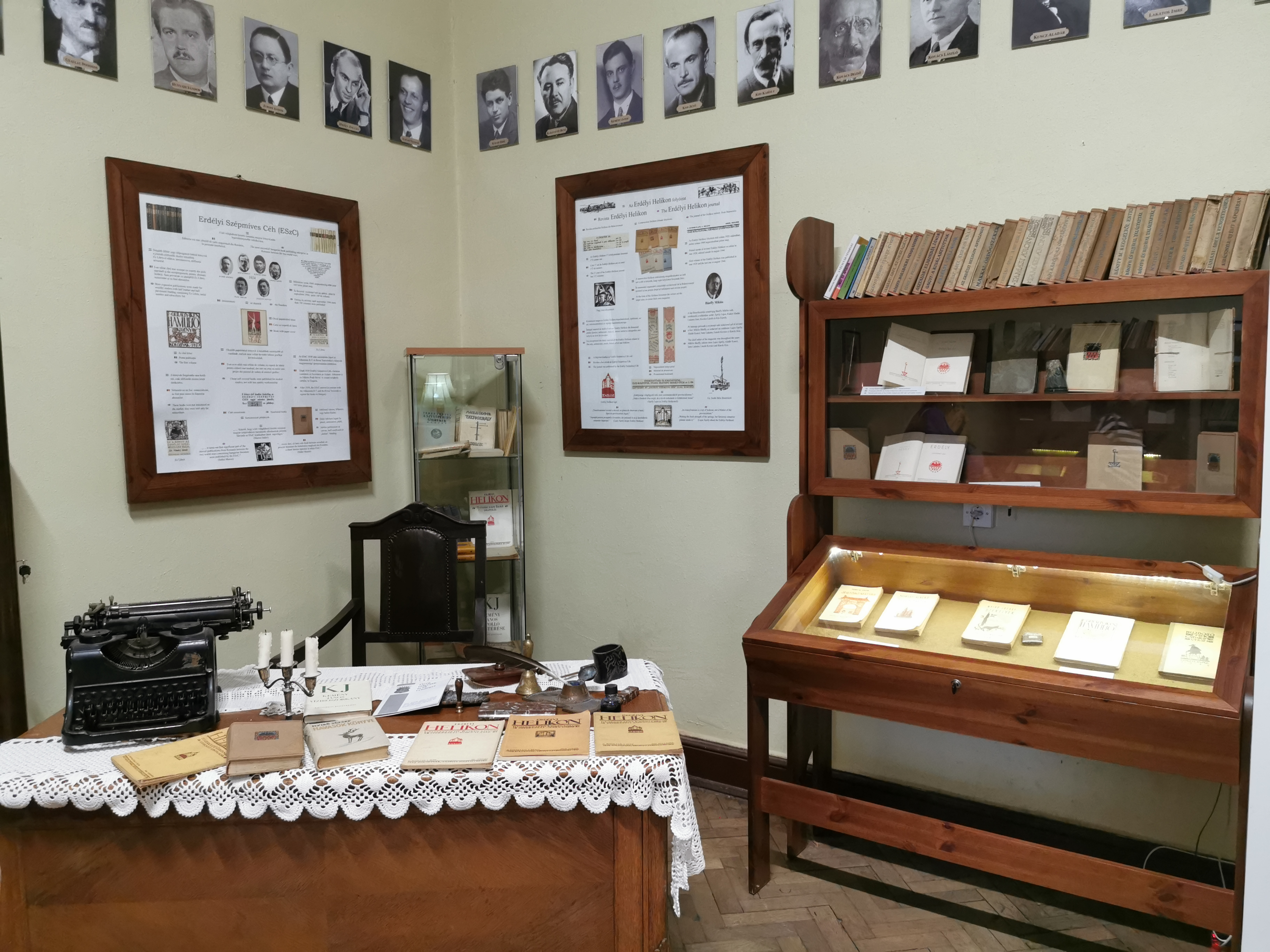
