= László Boldvai =

Hungarian economist and politician

Member of the National Assembly
- In office 28 June 1994 – 5 May 2014

Personal details
- Born: 23 December 1960 (age 65) Salgótarján, Hungary
- Party: MSZMP (1979–89); MSZP (1989–2016; 2016– )
- Other political affiliations: KISZ
- Profession: economist, politician

László Boldvai (born 23 December 1960) is a Hungarian economist and politician, member of the National Assembly (MP) for Salgótarján (Nógrád County Constituency I) from 1994 to 2002 and from 2006 to 2010. He was also a Member of Parliament from the national list of the Hungarian Socialist Party (MSZP) from 2002 to 2006 and the Nógrád County regional list from 2010 to 2014.

== Early life ==
Boldvai was born on 23 December 1960 as the son of László Boldvai Sr., storekeeper at the Metallurgical Plant of Salgótarján, and Mária Fehér. He has a sister, judge Beáta (b. 1970). He finished his elementary and secondary studies in Salgótarján, graduating from the local Bolyai János Secondary Grammar School in 1979. He spent his compulsory military service in Szeged from 1979 to 1980. Boldai attended the Faculty of Economics of the Humboldt University of Berlin, where he earned a degree of foreign trade economist in 1985. Returning Hungary, he was employed by the Metallurgical Plant of Salgótarján as a foreign trader between 1985 and 1990.

In his young age, he became a member of the Hungarian Young Communist League (KISZ). In 1981, he was elected KISZ leader of the Hungarian students studying in the German Democratic Republic (GDR). He was appointed secretary of the KISZ branch in Salgótarján in 1985. He elevated to the position of first secretary of KISZ in Nógrád County in 1987. He received the merit of Excellent Youth Leader in 1979 and KISZ Merit in 1984. Boldvai also joined the Hungarian Socialist Workers' Party (MSZMP) in 1979.

Boldvai married to mathematics and physics teacher Csilla Konti in 1985. She taught at the Bolyai János Secondary Grammar School. They have two children Bence (b. 1989) and Kristóf (b. 1993).

== Political career ==
Boldvai became a founding member of the Hungarian Socialist Party (MSZP) in 1989. He served as chairman of its Nógrád County branch between 1989 and 1995. He was on the 61st place in the national list of the Socialist Party in the 1990 parliamentary election, but did not secure a mandate. He was elected to the national board in 1992. He was elected a Member of Parliament for Salgótarján during the 1994 parliamentary election. He was a vice chairman, then a simple member of the Budget and Finance Committee until 2014. He was appointed party treasurer in October 1994, replacing László Máté. He held the position until September 1998, when he was replaced by László Puch. He was re-elected MP for Salgótarján in the 1998 parliamentary election. He secured a parliamentary seat from his party's national list during the 2002 parliamentary election. He was a member of the Economic Committee from 2002 to 2003 and vice-chairman of the Audit Committee from 2003 to 2006. In 2003, he became chairman of the MSZP's Nógrád County branch again.

He was elected MP for Salgótarján again during the 2006 parliamentary election. He worked for the Budget, Finance and Audit Committee and its two sub-committees in that parliamentary term. He secured a mandate from the Nógrád County regional list of the MSZP in the 2010 parliamentary election. He worked for the Audit and Budget Committee (2010–2014), Youth, Social, Family and Housing Committee (2010–2014) and Consumer Protection Committee (2010). After the 2014 parliamentary election, he continued his work as a member of the General Assembly of Nógrád County. It was confirmed Boldvai was involved in managing the party's finances again by April 2016, preserving his political influence within MSZP.

== Controversies ==
Boldvai was involved in the so-called Tocsik corruption case in the 1990s, when he was accused of extortion and jobbery. Boldvai was sentenced to 10-month prison at first instance in 1999, but later was acquitted of the charges in 2003.

In November 2007, right-wing daily Magyar Nemzet reported, Boldvai began to build a 1050 square meters luxury villa in Salgótarján, which was completed by April 2009. Based on Boldvai's asset declarations over the years, the politician had no income outside his MP salary. Magyar Hírlap reported his wife used a BMW jeep and their elder son studied in Switzerland in the same time. Boldvai said before the Immunity Committee, he built the villa through savings, real estate sales and loans.

His wife, Csilla Konti was named in 2016 Panama Papers scandal; accordingly she owned an offshore company incorporated in Samoa with a bank account in Switzerland, which was opened in November 2012, and 80 million HUF was transferred there still that day. Investigative portal Direkt36 asked Boldvai his wife's offshore interests; initially he denied having any knowledge of her dealings. On 5 April 2016, Boldvai admitted to party chairman József Tóbiás, that the information about the offshore company was true and suspended his Socialist Party membership with immediate effect. However, Boldvai renewed his party membership in December 2016, without taking any party posts.
