= László Máté =

Hungarian politician (1952–2019)

Member of the National Assembly
- In office 28 June 1994 – 17 June 1998

Personal details
- Born: 24 January 1952 Budapest, Hungary
- Died: 11 August 2019 (aged 67)
- Party: MSZMP (1970–89); MSZP (1989–2019)
- Other political affiliations: KISZ
- Profession: politician

László Máté (24 January 1952 – 11 August 2019) was a Hungarian politician, member of the National Assembly (MP) via the national list of the Hungarian Socialist Party (MSZP) from 1994 to 1998.

== Career ==
Máté was born in Budapest on 24 January 1952 as the son of Sándor Máté and Anna Tompos. He had two siblings. Máté finished his secondary studies at the Bercsényi Miklós Vocational School. He was a graduate student in the food industry, and worked for various state companies from the 1970s.

He joined the Hungarian Socialist Workers' Party (MSZMP) in 1970. He was also involved in the ruling Communist party's youth branch, the Hungarian Young Communist League (KISZ). He was a founding member of the Hungarian Socialist Party (MSZP) in 1989. He was the inaugural chairman of the party's local branch in Kőbánya (10th district of Budapest), and was appointed party treasurer in May 1990. He served in this capacity until October 1994, when he was replaced by László Boldvai.

Máté was elected a Member of Parliament via the national list of the MSZP in the 1994 parliamentary election. He also served as a deputy chairman of the party from 1994 to 1996. Máté retired from politics after the 1998 parliamentary election.

== Personal life ==
Máté married Julianna Nesztl, who worked for Taurus Hungarian Rubber Works. They had two children, László (b. 1972) and Viktória (b. 1978).

László Máté died on 11 August 2019, at the age of 67.
