= Peter Köbölkúti =

Hungarian nobleman

- Lord of Köbölkút

Vice-palatine
- Reign: 1234
- Predecessor: Martin (1221)
- Successor: Endre
- Died: after 1245

Peter Köbölkúti (Hungarian: Köbölkúti Péter, Latin: Petrus de Cubulcut(h); died after 1245) was a Hungarian noble in the first half of the 13th century, who served as vice-palatine in 1234.

== Career ==
His parentage is unknown. It is possible that he originated from the gens (clan) Tardos. He possessed lands in Esztergom County. His permanent seat was Köbölkút (present-day Gbelce, Slovakia).

Köbölkúti first appears with the title of comes in contemporary records in 1233. Through royal mediation, he and his neighbor Bag, lord of Ösztövér (present-day Nová Vieska, Slovakia) reconciled with their opponent Witya, lord of Császár. They handed over a portion in Ösztövér to Witya in accordance with their agreement.

Köbölkúti was installed as vice-palatine in 1234, under Denis, son of Ampud. He was styled as "vicepalatinus" and "viceiudex" in the charters in that year. It is possible that he became vice-palatine, because his lands laid near Esztergom, the capital of the Kingdom of Hungary, and substituted the palatine in judicial cases in his absence. For instance, he judged over a lawsuit between plaintiffs File Miskolc, his brother Thomas and Farkas, ispán of the royal forest of Patak and defendant Mikó Miskolc regarding the estate Mályi. Köbölkúti ruled in favor of the plaintiffs, and Mikó had to pledge his estate to them. Thereafter, Palatine Denis confirmed his deputy's verdict transcribing the charter. During another trial, Köbölkúti ruled in favor of Hahold III Hahót regarding the estate Keszi in Zala County. According to the verdict, the defendants pledged the estate to Hahold, but refused to exchange it thereafter. Hahold, thus, became the new owner of Keszi. Denis confirmed this judgment letter too. These palatial confirmations indicate that the vice-palatine did not yet have independent decision-making powers.

Around the time when Béla IV ascended the Hungarian throne in 1235, Köbölkúti was succeeded as vice-palatine by Endre. He sold his estate Karva in Esztergom County (present-day Kravany nad Dunajom, Slovakia), together with two fishponds and a forest to Nicholas Zoárd, Count of the Queen's Heralds in 1245.

== Sources ==
- Karácsonyi, János (1900). A magyar nemzetségek a XIV. század közepéig. [The Hungarian genera until the middle of the 14th century] (in Hungarian). Hungarian Academy of Sciences.
- Szőcs, Tibor (2012). Az Árpád-kori nádorok és helyetteseik okleveleinek kritikai jegyzéke [A Critical Register of Charters from Palatines and their Deputies of the Árpádian Era] (in Hungarian). Magyar Országos Levéltár. ISBN 978-963-631-219-0.
- Szőcs, Tibor (2014). A nádori intézmény korai története, 1000–1342 [An Early History of the Palatinal Institution: 1000–1342] (in Hungarian). Magyar Tudományos Akadémia Támogatott Kutatások Irodája. ISBN 978-963-508-697-9.
- Zsoldos, Attila (2011). Magyarország világi archontológiája, 1000–1301 [Secular Archontology of Hungary, 1000–1301] (in Hungarian). História, MTA Történettudományi Intézete. ISBN 978-963-9627-38-3.
