= Michael Kacsics =

Hungarian nobleman

Voivode of Transylvania
- Reign: 1209–1212
- Predecessor: Benedict, son of Korlát
- Successor: Berthold of Merania
- Died: after 1228
- Noble family: gens Kacsics
- Spouse: unknown
- Issue: Leustach; Falkos

Michael from the kindred Kacsics (Hungarian: Kacsics nembeli Mihály, Croatian: Mihovil Kačić; died after 1228) was a Hungarian distinguished nobleman from the gens Kacsics (Kačić). His parents' identity is unknown. His only brother was Simon Kacsics, ban of Slavonia in 1212. Michael had two sons, Leustach, ancestor of the Zagyvafői family, and Falkos, the first member of the Falkos branch and grandfather of Thomas Szécsényi. Through Falkos, Michael was forefather of the Szécsényi, Farkas de Szeszárma (Lekér, Harina), Tompos de Libercse, Radó de Libercse and Geréb de Vingárt families.

Michael served as voivode of Transylvania between 1209 and 1212. Besides that he was also ispán (comes) of Bihar County in 1209. Michael was the first voivode to receive a land grant in the province of Transylvania, around 1210. However, these originally uninhabited lands along the upper courses of the river Maros (present-day Mureș) were confiscated in 1228.

He was appointed ban of Slavonia in 1212, alongside his brother. Simon, along with Peter, son of Töre, played a decisive role in the murder of Queen Gertrude of Merania in 1213. Michael probably also took part in the preparation of the assassination. After the return of Andrew II of Hungary from Halychina, only Peter was executed by impalement, the Kacsics clan could retain their estates yet. The land confiscation in 1228 might be a sign of the subsequent retaliation.

== Sources ==
- Curta, Florin (2006). Southeastern Europe in the Middle Ages, 500-1250. Cambridge University Press. ISBN 978-0-521-89452-4.
- Engel, Pál (2001). The Realm of St Stephen: A History of Medieval Hungary, 895-1526. I.B. Tauris Publishers. ISBN 1-86064-061-3.
- Makkai, László (1994). "The Emergence of the Estates (1172–1526)". In: Köpeczi, Béla (editor), History of Transylvania. Akadémiai Kiadó. ISBN 963-05-6703-2.
- (in Hungarian) Markó, László (2006). A magyar állam főméltóságai Szent Istvántól napjainkig – Életrajzi Lexikon ("The High Officers of the Hungarian State from Saint Stephen to the Present Days – A Biographical Encyclopedia") (2nd edition); Helikon Kiadó Kft., Budapest; ISBN 963-547-085-1.
- (in Hungarian) Zsoldos, Attila (2011). Magyarország világi archontológiája, 1000–1301 ("Secular Archontology of Hungary, 1000–1301"). História, MTA Történettudományi Intézete. Budapest. ISBN 978-963-9627-38-3

Michael I Genus Kacsics Born: ? Died: after 1228
Political offices
Preceded by Benedict, son of Korlát	Voivode of Transylvania; 1209–1212	Succeeded by Berthold of Merania
Preceded by Berthold of Merania	Ban of Slavonia alongside Simon Kacsics; 1212	Succeeded by Martin Hont-Pázmány
