= Albert Bogátradvány =

Hungarian nobleman

Vice-palatine
- Reign: 1236–1239
- Predecessor: Endre
- Successor: ?
- Died: after 1239
- Noble family: gens Bogátradvány
- Father: Wolfart

Albert from the kindred Bogátradvány (Hungarian: Bogátradvány nembeli Albert; died after 1239) was a Hungarian noble in the first half of the 13th century, who served as vice-palatine from 1236 to 1239.

== Career ==
Albert was born into the gens (clan) Bogátradvány. According to the chronicler Simon of Kéza, the kindred originated from the Kingdom of Bohemia and initially possessed lands in Zemplén County. Albert's father was a certain Wolfart (Volphar). He had a brother Peter.

Both Albert and Peter entered the service of Denis Tomaj, who functioned as Palatine of Hungary from 1235 to 1241. Albert is styled as vice-palatine (Latin: viceiudex palatini) between 1236 and 1239. On the occasion of a lawsuit or contract of sale, he determined the borders of Egyházasgégény in 1237. Both Albert and Peter, alongside other members of the kindred possessed lands around the hill Haláp in the northern part of Tapolca basin in Zala County.

== Sources ==
- Karácsonyi, János (1901). A magyar nemzetségek a XIV. század közepéig. I. kötet [The Hungarian genera until the middle of the 14th century, Vol. 1] (in Hungarian). Hungarian Academy of Sciences.
- Szőcs, Tibor (2014). A nádori intézmény korai története, 1000–1342 [An Early History of the Palatinal Institution: 1000–1342] (in Hungarian). Magyar Tudományos Akadémia Támogatott Kutatások Irodája. ISBN 978-963-508-697-9.
- Zsoldos, Attila (2011). Magyarország világi archontológiája, 1000–1301 [Secular Archontology of Hungary, 1000–1301] (in Hungarian). História, MTA Történettudományi Intézete. ISBN 978-963-9627-38-3.
