= Endre (vice-palatine) =

Hungarian nobleman

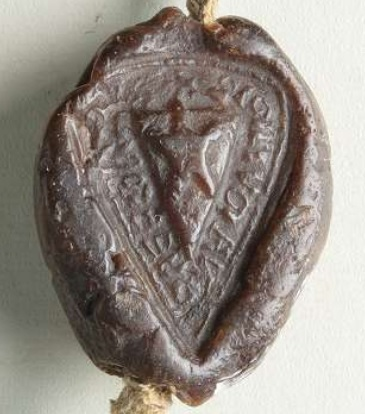
- Seal of Endre (1235)

Vice-palatine
- Reign: 1235
- Predecessor: Peter Köbölkúti
- Successor: Albert Bogátradvány
- Died: after 1235

Endre or Endri (died after 1235) was a Hungarian noble in the first half of the 13th century, who served as vice-palatine in 1235.

== Career ==
He appears in the dignity (Latin: vicepalatinus) in 1235, when King Béla IV ascended the Hungarian throne. His name appears only once, in a charter issued by himself in that year. He succeeded Peter Köbölkúti in that position, who is mentioned in this capacity in the previous year. In the document, Endre ruled in a lawsuit between Nicholas, Urban and Martin, sons of Alexander from Gic (progenitors of the influential Ghyczy family) and inhabitants of Románd (including their head Aignan, all of them were the subjects of the Diocese of Győr) regarding lands in the latter place, ordering a joust between inexperienced duelists. According to the charter, the duelist of Alexander's sons defeated his opponent.

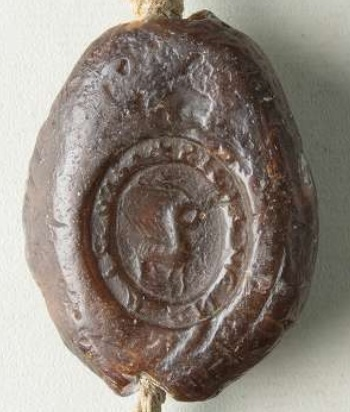
Coat-of-arms of comes Andrew on the back of Endre's seal (1235)

The seal of Endre preserved in an unusual and unique form. With the scription "SIGILV ENDRI CO M—", it is an approx. 32 × 25 mm, shield-shaped with the image of coat-of-arms shield, inside a star. On the back of the seal there is another figure (in a completely unusual way) with the inscription "SIGILLVM ANDREE COMITIS". Based on his seal (five-pointed star in a triangular shield), Szilárd Sulica identified Endre as a member of the gens (clan) Hont-Pázmány, while he considered the reverse coat-of-arms (he argued it depicts a griffin in a ring seal) belongs to Denis Tomaj, who served as Palatine of Hungary from 1235 to 1241. In contrast, Kornél Szovák considered that, instead of the five-pointed star, the image of the seal can also depict a stylized flying bird, while the image on the back perhaps presents a dragon. He refused Endre's identification with the Hont-Pázmány kindred, as the crests of clan members always appear in a six-pointed star. Szovák argued that the unidentified comes Andrew perhaps functioned as palatine for a brief time in 1235, who confirmed the judgment of his deputy Endre with his seal.

Tibor Szőcs considered that there was a brief interregnum period between the terms of Denis, son of Ampud (1231–1235) and Denis Tomaj (1235–1241), when Béla IV became king and began a purge among his father's former confidants (Denis, son of Ampud was imprisoned and blinded, for instance). In this concept, Endre headed the palatinal court on a temporary basis. Szőcs argued that comes Andrew was perhaps ispán of Veszprém County, as both villages (Gic and Románd) laid in that county.

Kornél Szovák questioned the authenticity of Endre's charter, based on its archaic and rudimentary abbreviation system, grammatical errors and poor style, while its content is also objectionable: it was not customary to order a joust against an ecclesiastical litigant while the nobles of Gic are described as "latores presencium", unusually. Szőcs argued that the unconventional stylistic and grammatical devices are due to the fact that Endre only had an improvised, inexperienced chancellery at his disposal, due to the uncertainty of the transition period.

Endre was succeeded as vice-palatine by Albert Bogátradvány in 1236.

== Sources ==
- Szovák, Kornél (1989). "Rátót nembeli Rolánd nádor kúriája [The Curia of Palatine Roland of the Rátót Kindred]". In Somfai, Balázs (ed.). A Dunántúl településtörténete VII. Falvak, várak és puszták a Dunántúlon (XI–XIX. század) (in Hungarian). Hungarian Academy of Sciences. pp. 299–316. ISBN 963-7121-16-1.
- Szőcs, Tibor (2012). Az Árpád-kori nádorok és helyetteseik okleveleinek kritikai jegyzéke [A Critical Register of Charters from Palatines and their Deputies of the Árpádian Era] (in Hungarian). Magyar Országos Levéltár. ISBN 978-963-631-219-0.
- Zsoldos, Attila (2011). Magyarország világi archontológiája, 1000–1301 [Secular Archontology of Hungary, 1000–1301] (in Hungarian). História, MTA Történettudományi Intézete. ISBN 978-963-9627-38-3.
