= City with county rights (Hungary) =

Level of administrative subdivision in Hungary

A city with county rights (or urban county, Hungarian: megyei jogú város, MJV) is a level of administrative subdivision in Hungary. Since 1994, all county seats have been automatically awarded this status, which was the only method between 2012–2022 allowing a city to earn county rights. All cities that earned this status before 2012 have retained it; there is no way to revoke the status by law. From 2006 until 2022, there were 23 cities with county rights, and there have been 25 since 1 May 2022. Before 1950, cities with former "municipal rights" (törvényhatósági jogú város) had a similar status as the present urban counties.

Budapest is not considered an urban county and instead has the special status of capital city.

Every city with county rights is allowed to be subdivided into districts. The representative body is the General Assembly (közgyűlés) which elects with the County Assembly a council that takes care of different tasks related to the county. Cities with county rights performs the tasks and powers of the county as its own authority but must provide some public services to the whole or a large area of the county (eg. education, health services, cultural services). Assemblies of the county and the urban county cooperate via a coordination committee to prepare and coordinate common tasks.

== History ==
Between 1954 and 1971, the four largest regional cities received the megyei jogú város title. These were Debrecen, Miskolc, Pécs and Szeged. Then, from 1971 to 1989, the four previous cities and Győr were granted a new status known as "county city" (megyei város). This status was also extended to three other cities in 1989: Kecskemét, Nyíregyháza and Székesfehérvár (county seats and over 100,000 residents). After the end of Communism, this status was abolished and replaced by the urban counties. In 1990 the earlier eight megyei város and twelve additional cities became megyei jogú város which reached 50 thousand residents as limited by law. In 1994 all county seat earned the title by law modification (Salgótarján and Szekszárd became urban counties). In 2006 Érd also earned the title after demanded since residents exceeded 50 thousand by the 2000s. Though some of the cities which are not county seats meanwhile decreased under the limit, they still retained their status (Dunaújváros, Hódmezővásárhely, Nagykanizsa). Since 2012 it is declared by law that earlier earned status could not be lost, as well that cities need to become county seats before earning urban city title. In 2022 the law was amended that National Assembly can grant the status to any city annexed to the law as a list, and the same time named Baja and Esztergom in the annex.

== List ==
Coats of arms	City	County	Population (2013)	Urban county since	Mayor
	Baja	Bács-Kiskun	37 326	2022	Nyirati, Klára
	Békéscsaba	Békés	61 046 ▼	1990	Szarvas, Péter
	Debrecen	Hajdú-Bihar	204 333 ▼	1990	Papp, László
	Dunaújváros	Fejér	46 813 ▼	1990	Pintér, Tamás
	Eger	Heves	54 867 ▼	1990	Mirkóczi, Ádám
	Érd	Pest	63 333 ▲	2006	Csőzik, László
	Esztergom	Komárom-Esztergom	30 062	2022	Hernádi, Ádám
	Győr	Győr-Moson-Sopron	128 567 ▲	1990	Pintér, Bence
	Hódmezővásárhely	Csongrád-Csanád	45 700 ▼	1990	Márki-Zay, Péter
	Kaposvár	Somogy	65 337 ▼	1990	Szita, Károly
	Kecskemét	Bács-Kiskun	111 863 ▲	1990	Szemereyné Pataki, Klaudia
	Miskolc	Borsod-Abaúj-Zemplén	162 905 ▼	1990	Veres, Pál
	Nagykanizsa	Zala	49 070 ▼	1990	Balogh, László
	Nyíregyháza	Szabolcs-Szatmár-Bereg	118 185 ▼	1990	Kovács, Ferenc
	Pécs	Baranya	147 719 ▼	1990	Péterffy, Attila
	Salgótarján	Nógrád	37 199 ▼	1994	Fekete, Zsolt
	Sopron	Győr-Moson-Sopron	60 528 ▲	1990	Farkas, Ciprián
	Szeged	Csongrád-Csanád	161 837 ▼	1990	Botka, László
	Szekszárd	Tolna	33 599 ▼	1994	Ács, Rezső
	Székesfehérvár	Fejér	99 247 ▼	1990	Cser-Palkovics András
	Szolnok	Jász-Nagykun-Szolnok	73 193 ▼	1990	Szalay, Ferenc
	Szombathely	Vas	77 547 ▼	1990	Nemény, András
	Tatabánya	Komárom-Esztergom	67 406 ▼	1990	Szűcsné Posztovics, Ilona
	Veszprém	Veszprém	60 876 ▼	1990	Porga, Gyula
	Zalaegerszeg	Zala	59 618 ▼	1990	Balaicz, Zoltán
