= Salgótarján =

City in Nógrád, Hungary

Salgótarján Šalgotarján
- City with county rights
- Salgótarján Megyei Jogú Város
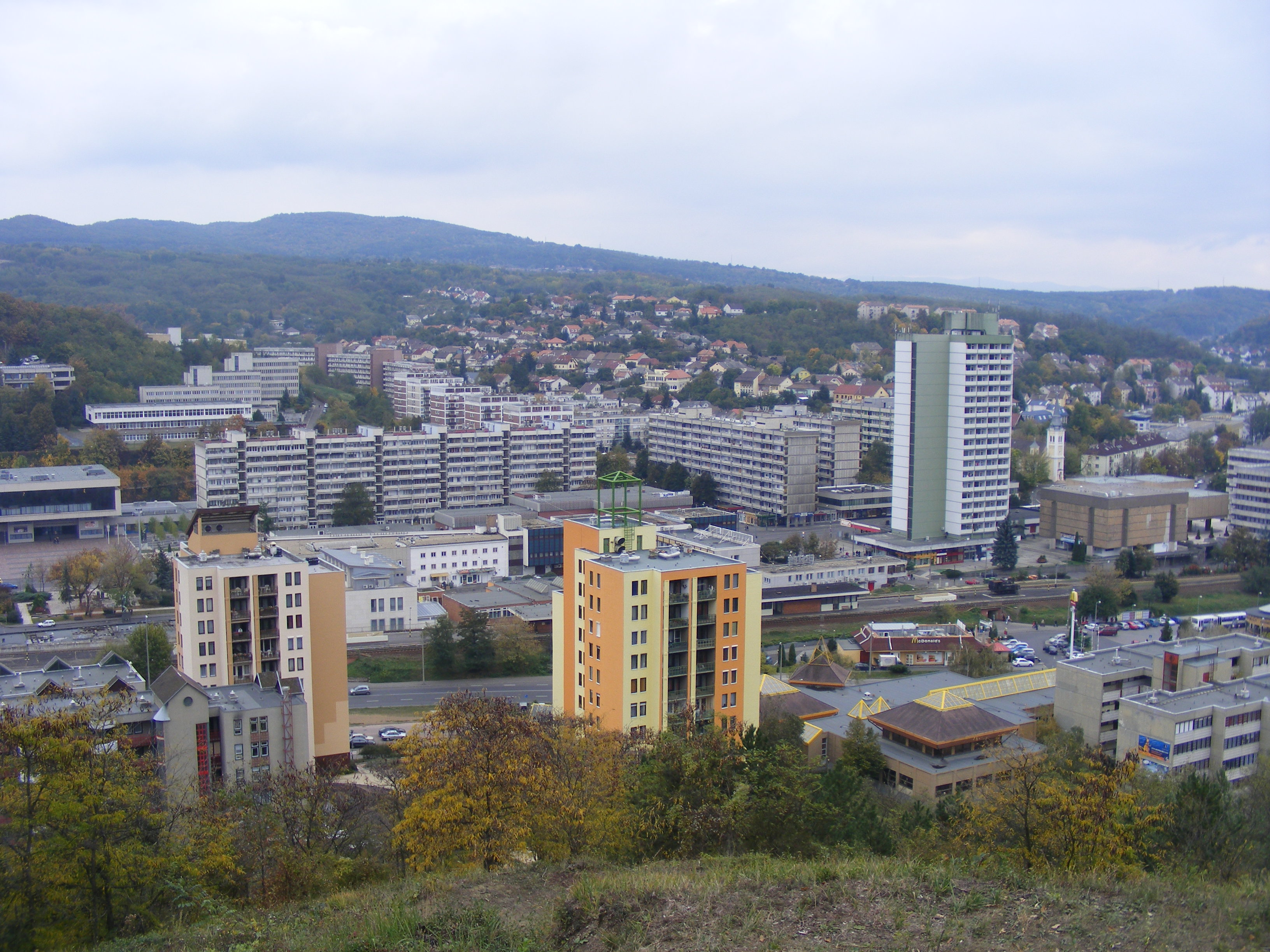
- Skyline of Salgótarján

- Flag Coat of arms

- Location within Nógrád County Location within Hungary
- Coordinates: 48.104042°N 19.807456°E
- Country: Hungary
- County: Nógrád
- District: Salgótarján

Government
  - Mayor: Zsolt Fekete (MSZP)

Area
  - Total: 102.96 km^{2} (39.75 sq mi)
- Elevation: 299 m (981 ft)

Population (2017)
  - Total: 34,627
  - Density: 336.32/km^{2} (871.05/sq mi)
- Demonym: salgótarjáni

Population by ethnicity
  - Hungarians: 85.9%
  - Romani: 5.4%
  - Germans: 0.4%
  - Slovaks: 0.3%
  - Romanians: 0.1%
  - Others: 0.7%

Population by religion
  - Roman Catholic: 39.4%
  - Greek Catholic: 0.2%
  - Calvinists: 2.2%
  - Lutherans: 1.2%
  - Other: 2.6%
  - Non-religious: 25.1%
  - Unknown: 29.3%
- Time zone: UTC+1 (CET)
  - Summer (DST): UTC+2 (CEST)
- Postal code: 3100
- Area code: (+36) 32
- Website: www.salgotarjan.hu

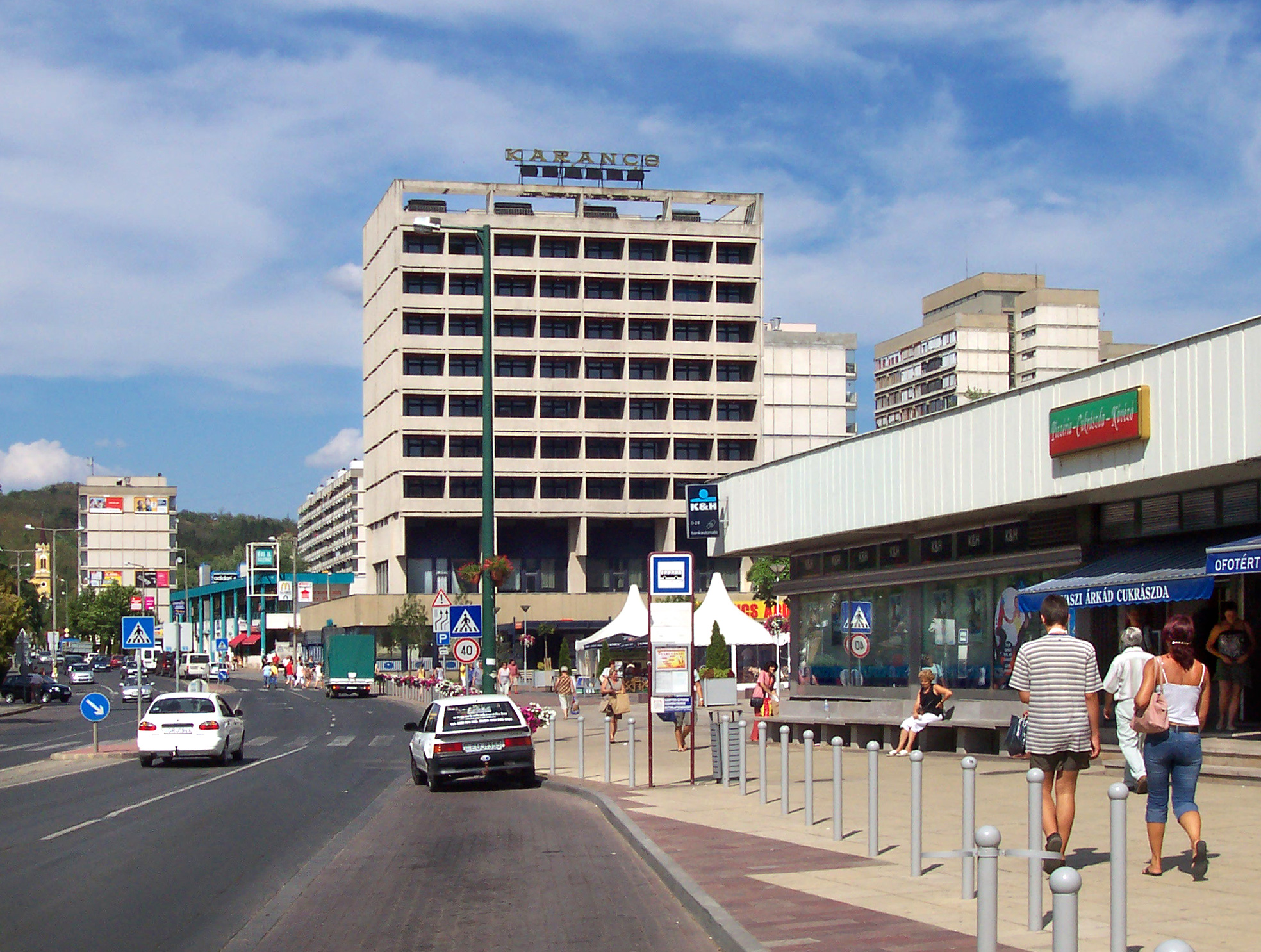
'Karancs' Hotel - Downtown Salgótarján

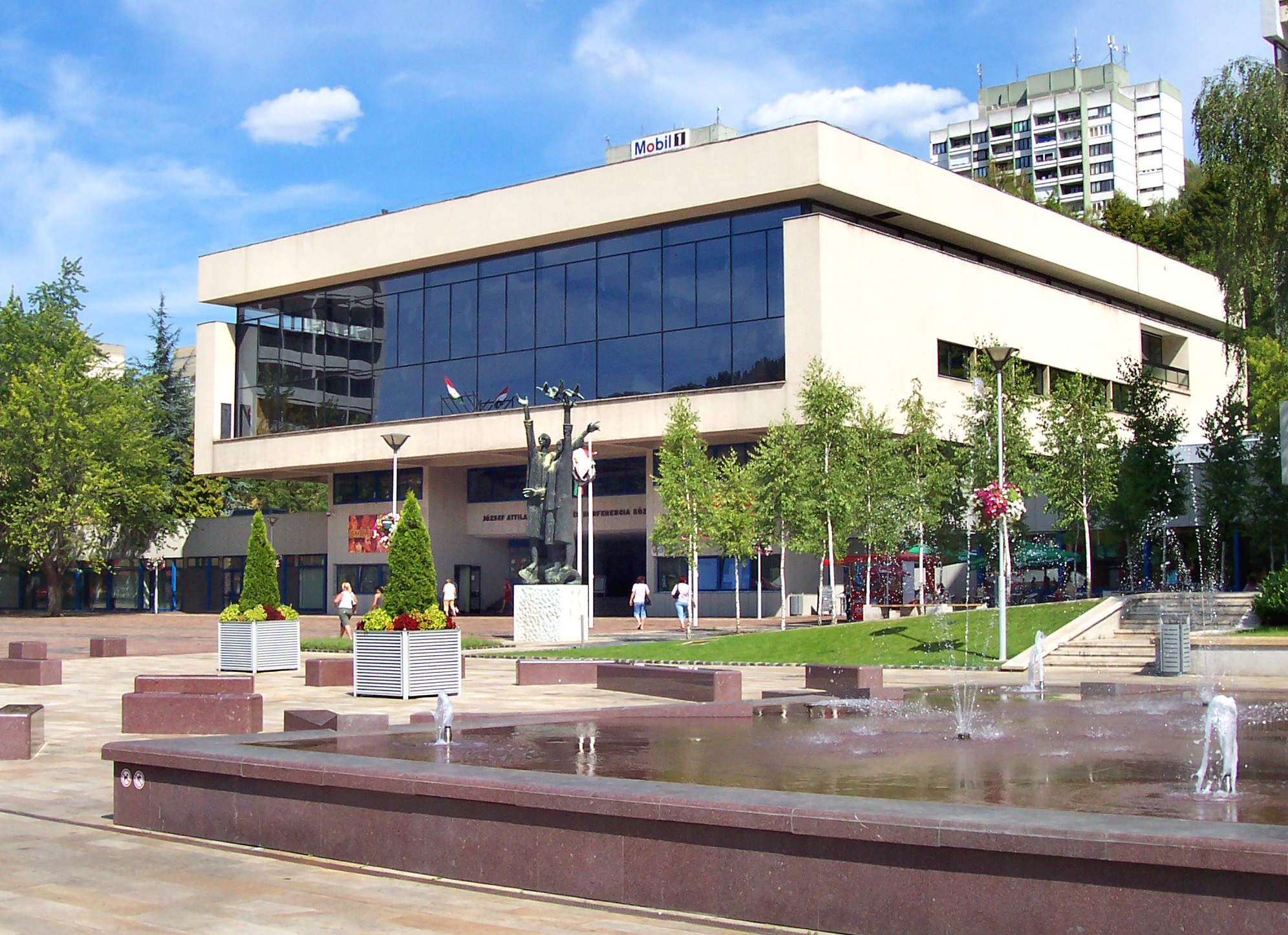
Conference centre

Salgótarján (Hungarian pronunciation: [ˈʃɒlɡoːtɒrjaːn]; Slovak: Šalgotarján, German: Schalgau) is a city with county rights in Hungary, the capital of Nógrád County, north-eastern Hungary, making it the third least populous county capital. The nearby Salgó Castle is a well-known tourist attraction.

== Location ==
At the foot of Karancs mountain, in the Cserhát hills, 250 meters above sea level, 120 km (75 mi) north-east from Budapest, 70 km (43 mi) west from Miskolc. Salgótarján is surrounded by forests and hills topped with castle ruins, which are accessible by bus that may be taken from the center of town.

== History ==
The town already existed in the Middle Ages, but information on it is scarce possibly because it was a small settlement. The word salgó means "shining" in Old Hungarian, while Tarján was the name of one of the Hungarian tribes conquering the area.

The castle of Salgó was built in the 13th century on a mountain of volcanic origin. In the 13th century the town already had a church.

After the 1682 siege of the nearby Castle of Fülek (today Fiľakovo, Slovakia) the town was deserted, and new settlers arrived only ten years later, but remained a small village.

Development came in the mid-19th century, when a coal mine was opened nearby. The job opportunities provided by the mine and the developing industry began to attract people. The village grew quickly and was granted town status in 1922. The remains of the mining industry are documented in the Mine Museum, which is located next to the main entrance of the mine.

In 1950, Salgótarján became the capital of Nógrád County instead of the previous county seat Balassagyarmat, although the county offices did not move there until 1952. In the next twenty years several villages were annexed to the growing city.

The coal mines closed years ago, leaving the city with high unemployment rates.

In 1994, Salgótarján was granted the rank of city with county rights, in accord with a new law stating that all county seats are cities with county rights. (Previously only cities with a population over 50.000 were granted county rights, and Salgótarján was one of only two county seats that had smaller population than 50.000; the other was Szekszárd).

== Places of interest ==
The town is near two ruined castles and contains two museums, among other places of interest.

- Plébániatemplom (Cathedral), located opposite the County History Museum, is the main church in the town.
- Nógrádi Történeti Múzeum (county of Nógrád History Museum) is the town's principal museum with exhibits about the history of the county. There is a special exhibit on János Balázs, the Romany poet and painter who lived in the city.
- Nógrádi Történeti Múzeum Bányászati Kiállítóhelye (Mining Museum), is the main mining museum in the country, with exhibits about the history of mining in the region. On display are a section of the mine and mining equipment.
- Somoskő (Šomoška) Castle in the suburb of Somoskő is the better preserved of the two castles. It is situated atop a 526-meter-tall (1,726 ft) hill. One of the three original towers is restored. The castle lies on the Slovak side of the border, but it is easily accessible from the Hungarian village of Somoskő.
- Salgó Castle Ruins, in the suburb of Salgóbánya, is 625 meters above sea level, giving it a panoramic view of the area.

== Sport ==
The city has an association football club. Salgótarjáni BTC competed in the Nemzeti Bajnokság III.

== Notable people ==
- Zoltán Bodnár, economist, banker and jurist
- László Boldvai, economist and politician
- Anette Dawn, make-up artist and professional sex worker
- Tamás Grúz, football player
- Tünde Handó, jurist and judge
- Gábor Juhász, politician
- Péter Kovács, former professional footballer
- Zoltán Lipták, former footballer
- Gergő Oláh, singer and countertenor
- Tibor Sisa, professional football manager and former player
- Naftali Herstik, former chief cantor of the Great Synagogue of Jerusalem

== Twin towns – sister cities ==
Salgótarján is twinned with:

- Banská Bystrica, Slovakia
- Gliwice, Poland
- Kemerovo, Russia
- Lučenec, Slovakia
- Uricani, Romania
- Vantaa, Finland
- Vigarano Mainarda, Italy
