= Denis Tomaj =

Hungarian baron

Denis (II) Tomaj
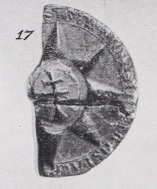
- Seal of Denis Tomaj (1237)

Palatine of Hungary
- Reign: 1235–1241
- Predecessor: Denis, son of Ampud
- Successor: Arnold Hahót
- Died: 11 April 1241; Battle of Mohi
- Noble family: gens Tomaj
- Issue: Üne I Samud; Denis III; Nicholas I
- Father: Denis I

Denis from the kindred Tomaj (Hungarian: Tomaj nembeli Dénes; died 11 April 1241) was a Hungarian influential baron in the first half of the 13th century, who served as the Palatine of Hungary under King Béla IV from year 1235 to 1241, until his death at the Battle of Mohi.

== Family ==
Denis (II) was born into the gens (clan) Tomaj of Pecheneg origin. The kindred descended from chieftain Tonuzoba, who settled with his people in the Principality of Hungary during the reign of Taksony in the mid-10th century. The eponymous ancestor of the kindred Tomaj – Tonuzoba's grandson – lived in the time of King Stephen I of Hungary (r. 1000–1038). The clan initially possessed lands in Heves County, but later acquired estates in Zala, Szabolcs and Szolnok counties too.

His father was Denis (I), whose name is known only. He had three brothers, Privartus (Pelbárt), Csák and possibly Urkund (Örkénd or Örkény). The marriage of Denis (II) with an unidentified noblewoman produced four sons: Üne (I), Samud, Denis (III) – progenitor of the powerful Losonci and Bánffy de Losoncz noble families – and Nicholas (I), ancestor of the lesser noble Tomaji and Bezdédi families.

== Early career ==
Denis began his career as a partisan of King Andrew II of Hungary. His name is first mentioned, when he served as Master of the horse from 1222 to 1224. Thereafter, Denis was made Master of the treasury in 1224, replacing Denis, son of Ampud. He functioned in this capacity until 1231. Beside that, he also administered Szolnok County at least between 1228 and 1230. His position proves that Szolnok County was not part of the territorial domain of King Andrew's son, Béla, Duke of Transylvania (the duke, who disagreed with his father's reform measures, was transferred from Slavonia to Transylvania as kind of "internal exile" in 1226).

For his loyalty, Denis was granted the villages Széplak and Gyeke in Kolozs County (present-day Goreni and Geaca in Romania, respectively) by Andrew II in 1228. Prior to that, both settlements were confiscated from Simon Kacsics because of his alleged involvement in the assassination of Queen Gertrude of Merania. Andrew donated these lands despite the fact that the villages belonged to the territorial domain of Duke Béla. The donation was made with the knowledge and consent of the duke, who was otherwise in a tense relationship with his father. Denis gradually became a prominent landowner in Transylvania. He invited and settled Saxon craftsmen in Szászrégen (present-day Reghin, Romania) in the same period. He possessed Idecs (today Ideciu de Jos, Romania) too (the Losoncis later built a fort there). He also acquired lands in Nógrád County around 1230, possibly from the fortune of Kacsics clan. One of the estates, Losonc (today Lučenec, Slovakia) and the surrounding villages became the eponymous residence of his descendants. It is possible that Denis or his namesake son built the castle of Divény (present-day Divín, Slovakia). He also possessed the nearby estate Gács (today Halič, Slovakia), where his descendants erected a stone castle.

After 1228, Denis Tomaj gradually developed a good relationship with Duke Béla, who took power in the royal council after another wave of dissatisfaction in that year, when Andrew II was forced to authorize his son to revise his previous land grants throughout Hungary. It is plausible that Denis assisted this intention in Szolnok County and the surrounding areas in Transylvania, and had no conflict with the duke. Andrew II regained influence over the royal council in 1231, expelling the partisans of Duke Béla from the government. The king suspended the review of royal donations and restored his financial reforms. Denis, because of his "bipolar policy", also lost his office and political influence for years. Denis Tomaj disappears from sources in the period between 1231 and 1235. Former historiography incorrectly claimed that Denis Tomaj is identical with that namesake baron, who served as Voivode of Transylvania between 1233 and 1234. However, historian Attila Zsoldos proved that Béla's loyal partisan and childhood friend Denis Türje held that office in the same period.

== Palatine of Hungary ==
Shortly before Andrew's death, Denis Tomaj was appointed Palatine of Hungary sometime at the turn of 1234 and 1235. Denis already bore the title shortly after March 1235. Based on a fragmented seal, historian Mór Wertner considered Denis Tomaj replaced Denis, son of Ampud in the position still in 1234. It is possible that Duke Béla had practically taken control of the country before the death of his ailing father. There is also an alternative argument that Andrew II, with the appointment of Denis – whose person was seen as a compromise between father and son –, sought to ease the transition and moderate Béla's anger towards the king's loyal supporters. Nevertheless, Denis avoided political purge and persecution, unlike many others, after Béla's ascension to the Hungarian throne in September 1235. Beside the most prestigious dignity in Hungary, Denis again functioned as ispán of Szolnok County between 1235 and 1241. A single document also styles him as ispán of Bihar County in November 1236 (he plausibly held the office for a brief time in 1235–1236). Shortly after his appointment, Andrew donated a half portion of the land Kozár in Szolnok County to Denis. Upon the instruction of Béla IV, Denis performed a diplomatic mission "beyond the Alps", i.e. in the Italian Peninsula in 1239. It is presumable that he visited the Roman Curia, because in that year, Pope Gregory IX authorized the Hungarian king to employ Jews and Muslims in royal financial administration, in exchange for Béla's renouncing of the taking back of royal estates.

In the first half of the 13th century, Denis Tomaj issued proportionately the most number of palatinal diplomas until the institutional reform of Roland Rátót. His eighteen charters with full text were preserved, thirteen of them are original (i.e. not transcribed or copied) documents. Beside that there are also other documents and two notes from the Regestrum Varadinense, which can be linked to his judicial activity. His vice-palatines or "palatinal vice-judges" were Endre or Andrew (1235) then Albert Bogátradvány (1236–1239). His notary was Matthias Hermán in 1239. Since the beginning of Denis' term, the palatinal bailiffs (pristaldus) began to be styled as "homo noster" ("our man"), which would completely displace the former term by the beginning of the 14th century. Several members of his bailiffs originated from the gens (clan) Rosd, a network of relatives evolved within the professional staff.

During his term, there was no a permanent palatinal court, the current lawsuits were discussed by his staff at the site in question. His judicial activity covered various parts of the kingdom. He delivered judgments over cases in, for instance, Bihar (1235, possibly), Hont, Zala (1236), Pozsony (1237) and Szatmár (1239) counties. During his judicial tours, Denis appeared in the settlements of a neighborhood at predetermined times so that plaintiffs and defendants could find him, as evidenced by a lawsuit in 1236 in Zala County, involving the future prelate Zlaudus Ják. Denis' term was mostly covered by the lawsuits initiated by the Pannonhalma Abbey and its forceful abbot Uros. After Béla IV granted asylum to the Cuman refugees, who arrived to the Hungarian border fleeing from the advancing Mongols in 1239, the king placed the Cumans under the direct jurisdiction of Denis Tomaj. Historian Tibor Szőcs argued Denis unusually, contrary to his successors, held ispánates in Eastern Hungary beside his position of Palatine, which laid near to the Cuman tribes' lands, thus he could be the first office-holder who became judge of the Cumans.

In 1239–1240, Denis Tomaj intended to establish a Cistercian abbey in Dénesvölgye (Latin: Vallis Dyonisii; lit. "Denis' Valley") along the stream Tugár (Tuhár) at the namesake village (present-day Slovakia), northwest of the lordship of Losonc. The General Chapter of the Cistercians instructed Szepes Abbey (or Savnik) to send monks to the newly erected monastery in 1240. If this is not possible, Dénesvölgye would become a filiation of the Morimond Abbey, which would ensure adequate staffing, according to the document. However, the process of founding was stalled due to the Mongol invasion and the death of Denis in the spring of 1241. Decades later, his sons finished the construction of the abbey dedicated to Saint Stephen I of Hungary. They, however, invited Benedictine friars instead of Cistercians to the newly erected monastery.

== Mongol invasion and death ==
[...] news came that the Tatars [Mongols] were devastating the confines of Hungary adjacent to Rus'. When this was confirmed to the king [Béla IV] by messengers, he sent his chief ispán, the palatine [Denis Tomaj], with an army to guard the Russian Gate – called the Mountain Gate [Veretskyi Pass] – through which the road leads to Hungary [...]. About the middle of Lent one of the palatine's men arrived post haste to the king and reported in the name of the count palatine that [the Tatars] had reached the Russian Gate and were destroying the border obstacles, and they were afraid that the palatine would not be able to withstand them unless the king sent help fast. The king, still incredulous, did not have armed warriors with him. While he was tarrying there amidst such anxieties, on the fourth day, the palatine himself arrived, having ridden night and day, and reported that in early March, on the twelfth, he had engaged them at the Gate. Almost all his men were cruelly killed by arrows and swords; he had escaped with a few and come to report what had happened.

— Master Roger's Epistle to the Sorrowful Lament upon the Destruction of the Kingdom of Hungary by the Tatars

Following the sack of Kiev and the disintegration of the Kievan Rus' in December 1240, the Mongols gathered in the lands bordering Hungary and Poland under the command of Batu Khan. The Hungarian royal council learned of military developments around Christmas. The Mongols demanded Béla's submission to their Great Khan Ögödei, but the Hungarian king refused to yield and decided to fortify the mountain passes along the eastern border. In early January 1241, Béla IV sent Denis Tomaj and his banderium to protect the Verecke Pass (also known as Russian Gate, present-day Veretskyi Pass in Ukraine), the most important natural pass of the Northeastern Carpathian Mountains. Local border guards of the gyepűelve also joined Denis' troops. The Mongols determined to hinder Denis' reconnaissance activity by plundering and torching the borderland between Hungary and Galicia.

Béla IV summoned a war council in Buda in mid-February 1241. Roger of Torre Maggiore's Carmen miserabile narrates that Denis sent couriers to the meeting, who arrived in early March 1241 and reported that the Mongols reached the Verecke Pass and demolished the barricades, and the palatine would not be able to withstand them in an open battle with the small troops he had received from the king and the army of the surrounding counties. On 12 March 1241, the main Mongol army led by Batu and Subutai stormed into Hungary after they forcibly demolished the wooden barricades with their forty thousand Russian axe-men, according to Thomas the Archdeacon's Historia Salonitana. The Mongols annihilated the defense forces of approximately 5,000 soldiers led by Denis Tomaj, who, severely injured, could only escape with a few men and hurried to Buda to report his defeat and the beginning of the Mongol invasion to the Hungarian king. Thereafter, Denis remained in the royal camp which marched to Pest on the left bank of the Danube then to the river Sajó. Denis Tomaj was killed in the Battle of Mohi on 11 April 1241.

== Sources ==
=== Primary sources ===
- Master Roger's Epistle to the Sorrowful Lament upon the Destruction of the Kingdom of Hungary by the Tatars (Translated and Annotated by János M. Bak and Martyn Rady) (2010). In: Rady, Martyn; Veszprémy, László; Bak, János M. (2010); Anonymus and Master Roger; CEU Press; ISBN 978-9639776951.

=== Secondary sources ===
- B. Szabó, János (2007). A tatárjárás. A mongol hódítás és Magyarország [The Mongol Invasion of Hungary] (in Hungarian). Corvina. ISBN 978-963-13-6348-7.
- Engel, Pál (1996). Magyarország világi archontológiája, 1301–1457, I. [Secular Archontology of Hungary, 1301–1457, Volume I] (in Hungarian). História, MTA Történettudományi Intézete. ISBN 963-8312-44-0.
- Karácsonyi, János (1901). A magyar nemzetségek a XIV. század közepéig. III. kötet [The Hungarian genera until the middle of the 14th century, Vol. 3] (in Hungarian). Hungarian Academy of Sciences.
- Keglevich, Kristóf (2007). "A szepesi apátság története az Árpád- és az Anjou-korban, 1223–1387 [History of the Szepes Abbey in the Árpádian and Anjou Ages, 1223–1387]". Fons. 14 (1). Szentpétery Imre Történettudományi Alapítvány: 3–58. ISSN 1217-8020.
- Markó, László (2006). A magyar állam főméltóságai Szent Istvántól napjainkig: Életrajzi Lexikon [Great Officers of State in Hungary from King Saint Stephen to Our Days: A Biographical Encyclopedia] (in Hungarian). Helikon Kiadó. ISBN 963-208-970-7.
- Pintér, János Zsolt (2005). "Tatárok és magyarok (1241–1242) [Tartars and Hungarians (1241–1242)]". Hadtörténelmi Közlemények (in Hungarian). 118 (3). Hadtörténeti Intézet és Múzeum: 660–696. ISSN 0017-6540.
- Szőcs, Tibor (2010). "A nádori oklevéladás kezdeti szakasza [The Initial Stage of the Palatinal Diploma]". In Almási, Tibor; Révész, Éva; Szabados, György (eds.). "Fons, skepsis, lex": Ünnepi tanulmányok a 70 esztendős Makk Ferenc tiszteletére (in Hungarian). Szegedi Középkorász Műhely. pp. 429–437. ISBN 978-963-30-6073-5.
- Szőcs, Tibor (2014). A nádori intézmény korai története, 1000–1342 [An Early History of the Palatinal Institution: 1000–1342] (in Hungarian). Magyar Tudományos Akadémia Támogatott Kutatások Irodája. ISBN 978-963-508-697-9.
- Zsoldos, Attila (2011). Magyarország világi archontológiája, 1000–1301 [Secular Archontology of Hungary, 1000–1301] (in Hungarian). História, MTA Történettudományi Intézete. ISBN 978-963-9627-38-3.
- Zsoldos, Attila (2022). Az Aranybulla királya [The King of the Golden Bull] (in Hungarian). Városi Levéltár és Kutatóintézet. ISBN 978-963-8406-26-2.

Denis II Genus Tomaj Born: ? Died: 11 April 1241
Political offices
Preceded by Ladislaus Kán	Master of the horse 1222–1224	Succeeded by Michael Bána
Preceded by Denis	Master of the treasury 1224–1231	Succeeded by Nicholas
Preceded by Denis	Palatine of Hungary; 1235–1241	Succeeded by Arnold Hahót
