= Martin Hont-Pázmány =

Hungarian lord (1200s CE)

Judge royal
- Reign: 1214
- Predecessor: Julius Kán
- Successor: Atyusz Atyusz
- Died: between 1236 and 1245
- Noble family: gens Hont-Pázmány
- Spouse: unknown
- Issue: none
- Father: Vajk

Martin from the kindred Hont-Pázmány (Hungarian: Hont-Pázmány nembeli Márton; died between 1236 and 1245) was a Hungarian influential lord, who served as Judge royal in 1214, during the reign of Andrew II of Hungary.

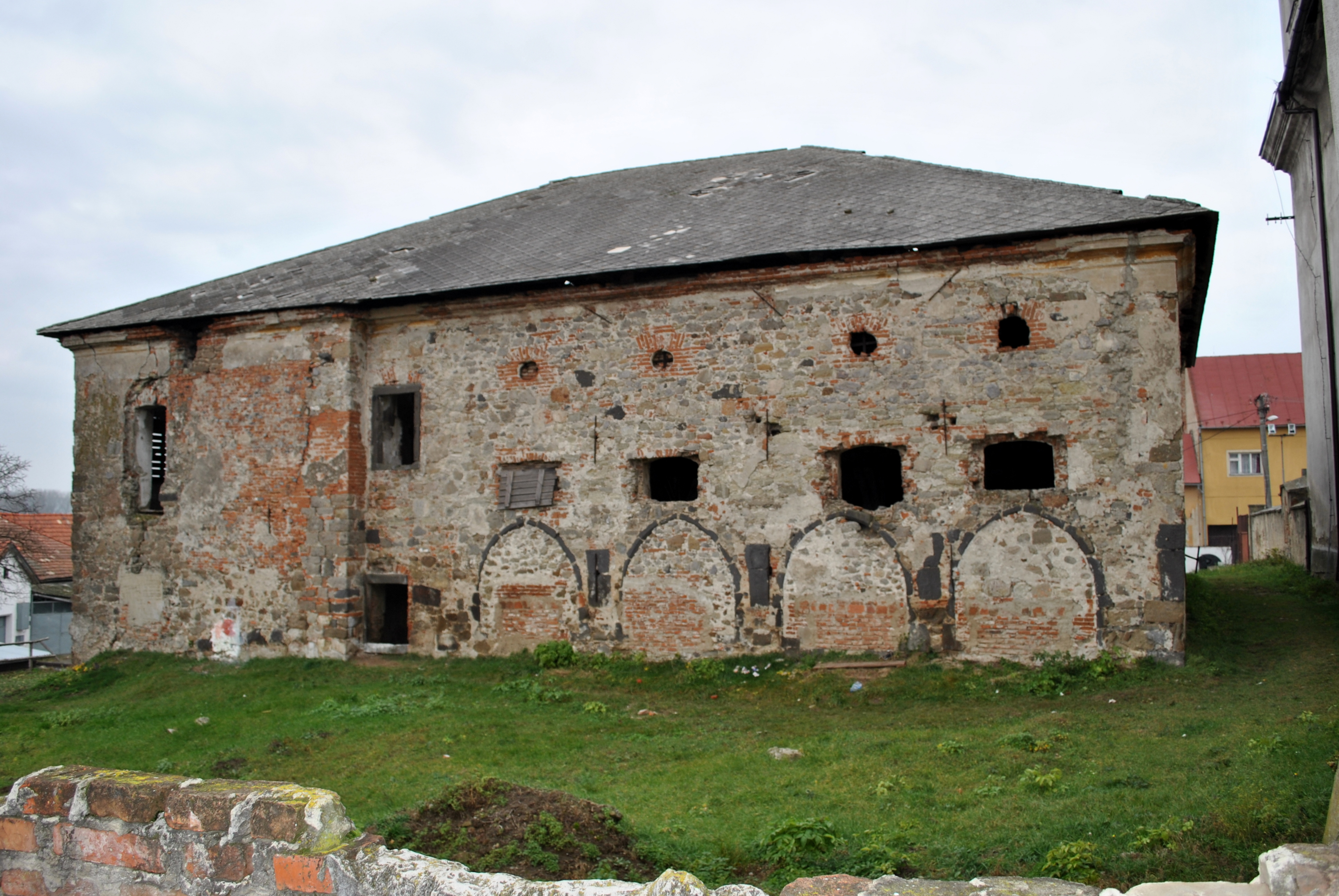
Ruins of Ipolyság (Šahy) Abbey

He was born into the Hont-Pázmány kindred of German ancestry, founded by knights Hont and Pázmány in the late 10th century. His father was Vajk, he had also two brothers. Martin was a loyal supporter of Duke Andrew, who rebelled against the realm of his brother, King Emeric at several times. In contemporary records, he was first mentioned as ispán of Szolnok County in 1201. He was appointed Ban of Slavonia in 1202, when his lord Andrew held the royal title of Duke of Slavonia. Martin served as ispán of Vas County from 1203 to 1206.

Following the sudden death of the child Ladislaus III, his uncle Andrew II ascended the throne in 1205. According to the charters, Martin functioned as ispán of Trencsén County (1208) and head of Újvár and Keve Counties (1209) during the early years of King Andrew II. In 1212 he was appointed Ban of Slavonia for the second time, replacing Michael Kacsics. He held this position until 1213 when he was succeeded by Julius Kán. He was promoted to Judge royal and ispán of Csanád County in 1214.

In 1220s he joined the inner circle of Duke Béla, who complained about his father's number of measures and land policy. Martin served as ispán of Fejér County in 1222. He was a titular Ban in the ducal court of Béla in 1224. He was also mentioned in this capacity in 1234, when he was delegated to a member of a court of justice chaired by Ugrin Csák, the Archbishop of Kalocsa. Martin founded the Ipolyság Abbey (today Šahy, Slovakia) around 1236, now during the reign of Béla IV (r. 1235–1270). He died without male descendants by 1245.

== Sources ==
- (in Hungarian) Markó, László (2006). A magyar állam főméltóságai Szent Istvántól napjainkig – Életrajzi Lexikon ("The High Officers of the Hungarian State from Saint Stephen to the Present Days – A Biographical Encyclopedia") (2nd edition); Helikon Kiadó Kft., Budapest; ISBN 963-547-085-1
- (in Hungarian) Zsoldos, Attila (2011). Magyarország világi archontológiája, 1000–1301 ("Secular Archontology of Hungary, 1000–1301"). História, MTA Történettudományi Intézete. Budapest. ISBN 978-963-9627-38-3

Martin Genus Hont-Pázmány Born: ? Died: between 1236 and 1245
Political offices
Preceded by Nicholas	Ban of Slavonia; 1202	Succeeded by Ipoch Bogátradvány
Preceded by Michael Kacsics	Ban of Slavonia; 1212–1213	Succeeded by Julius Kán
Preceded by Julius Kán	Judge royal 1214	Succeeded by Atyusz Atyusz
