= Kačić family =

Croatian noble family

Kačić
- Croatian & Hungarian noble family
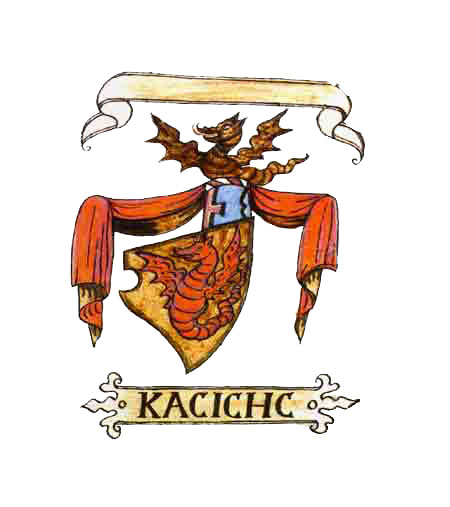
- Coat of arms from Fojnica Armorial
- Country: Kingdom of Croatia (1102–1526); Kingdom of Hungary (1102–1526); Kingdom of Bosnia (1320s–1452); Republic of Venice (1452–1797); Ottoman Empire (1499–1646)
- Etymology: Kača (Croatian): "snake"
- Founded: 12th century
- Titles: Župan, Comes, Knez, Duke, Ban, Conte
- Traditions: Roman Catholic
- Estate: List: Tinj, Nadin, Omiš, Makarska, Gradac, Salgó, Hollókő, Szécsény
- Cadet branches: List: Kacsics (Hungary), Zagyvafői, Libercsei, Libercsei Tompoši, Libercsei Radó, Libercsei Szécsényi, Füleki, Ozdini, Etre, Kecsői/Berzencei, Hollókői, Salgói, Bejei, Miošić, Barešić/Barišić

The Kačić family (Croatian: Kačići, Hungarian: Kacsics, Latin: Cacich) was one of the most influential Croatian noble families, and was one of the Croatian "twelve noble tribes" described in the Pacta conventa and Supetar Cartulary. Historical sources refer to members of this family as nobles in the area of the Luka županija in the Zadar-Biograd hinterland (12th–16th centuries), as the lords (knezes) of Omiš (12th and 13th centuries), and as the lords of the Makarska Riviera (15th and 16th centuries). Another prominent branch of the family, Kacsics, was part of the Hungarian nobility and from it branched many families including Szécsényi.

Family members of the Omiš branch were known for piracy in the Adriatic Sea, clashes with Venice, and were even accused of Patarene heresy. To the Makarska branch belonged the Croatian poet and Franciscian monk, Andrija Kačić Miošić, whose work Razgovor ugodni naroda slovinskog (Pleasant Conversation of Slavic People, 1756) was one of the most popular Croatian literary works for more than a century. Notable members of the Hungarian branch were Bans of Croatia and Slavonia.

== Etymology ==
The family derives from the Slavic kača (snake). Based on etymology, it is likely that the Hungarian Kačićs (Kacsics) are originally of Slavic rather than Hungarian origin. Latin sources also refer to the name as de genere Chacittorum, generatione Cacich, genus Chacittorum, nobiles de Cacich, Caçici, Cacicii, Cacicli, Caciki, Cazethi, Cazichi, Cazziki, Chacichi and Kazzeti. The Kačić name is distinct from the similar-sounding name of another noble family, Kašić (Chasich), and its derivations (Kasig, Kasige).

== History ==
The Kačić's family can be traced to the Pacta conventa, an agreement dating from 1102 (or later), according to which the Kačićs were one of the twelve Croatian noble tribes (genus) who accepted the Hungarian king Coloman as the new king of Croatia. They were represented by comes Juraj Kačić (Comittem Gurram de genere Chaçittorum). According to the Supetar Cartulary, they were one of six tribes which selected bans who, in turn, elected a new king in a case where the prior king died without leaving heirs. Some historians argued that the Croatian rex Slavac and other nobles with the title of Marianourm and Morsticum, often argued to be related to the Narentines, mentioned in the cartulary were originating from the tribe of Kačić.

The first mention of Kačićs is considered 1165, when the Byzantine chronicler John Kinnamos said that 57 cities in Croatia and Dalmatia as well the "nation Kačićs" came under the Byzantine rule. The Kačićs were mostly recorded in the scope of sales contracts and lands disputes, or as witnesses. In 1182, the first explicitly mentioned noblemen as members of the genus Kačić are Miroš Kačić (1166–82) and his son Dobroš, previously also Miroš's father Toljen (1164–66), the judge of Tinj, Toliš Kačić with sons Juraj and Deško, Premko Kačić with sons Dragoš and Pribislav, and likely Otra with his son Dragoslav.

The Kačić family originated in the Zadar hinterland near the Krka river, and when King Petar Krešimir IV mastered the Pagania, some members of the family likely relocated to the area between the Cetina and Neretva rivers. The social distinction between noble Kačićs in the Zadar-Biograd hinterland and the princely (knezes) Kačićs from Omiš remains uncertain, but the two families are considered to be related. The clearest established connection is the noble Hodimir, mentioned in 1207 in a charter of St. Peter's Church in Bubnjani near Tinj, whose son Nikola was an Omiš knez.

In the 12th and 13th centuries Kačićs possessed lands in the Zadar hinterland, in the wider area of Tinj, Nadin, Kačina Gorica, Kokićani and Kamenjani. From the mid-14th to 15th century, their holdings expanded to include Podnadin, Bistrovina, Butina, Kačina Gorica, Suhovaram, Grguricavas and Krneza, and the wider area around those villages. The center of the genus was in Nadin, for some Zadar, Nin and possibly Pag, where "dominum Caçigh" is mentioned. According to M. Marković, in the early 11th century, the lands West of Nadin were ruled by the tribe Lapčan, while in the East by family Kašić. The family name of the Kačićs can be found in the toponyms Kačina Gorica, Kačišćina (alleged second name for Bistrovina), Kačićić (Chacichich) and Kačić (Cacich).

In the 14th century the family members began to identify themselves by family names with the adjective "de generatione Cacich". In the next period the Kačićs can be traced through three families. In the 15th to 17th centuries a branch settled in the wider area of Cazin and Bosanska Krupa, where in 1487 there was a dispute between them and the Babonić noble family. The last mention of Nadin Kačićs dates back to 1527, when Šimun (Simon) was in the citadel of Zadar, after pressure from the Ottoman conquest.

== Omiš branch ==
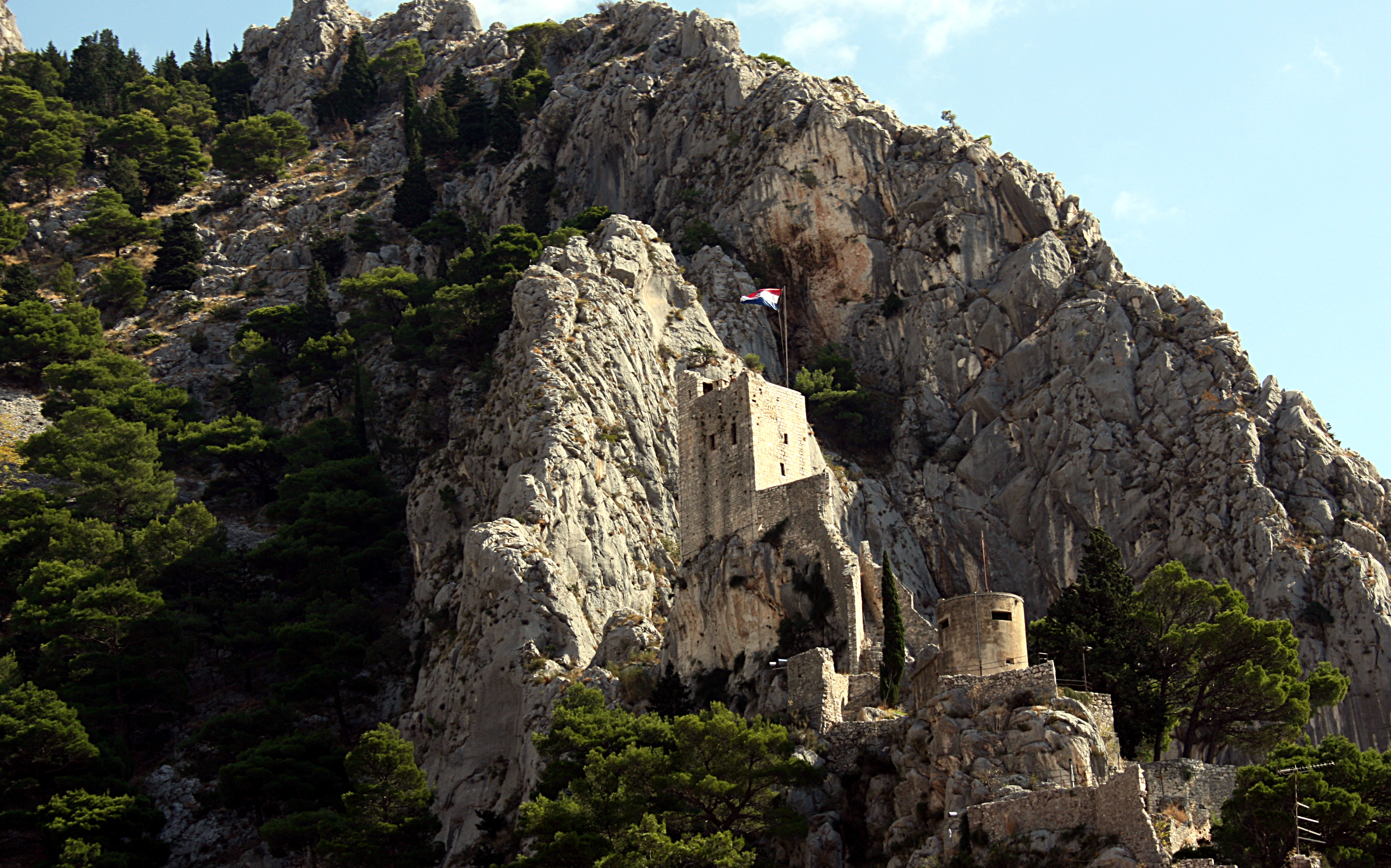
Mirabella Fortress (Peovica), where the Kačićs and pirates of Omiš had their main hideout.

The first known knez of Omiš, Nikola, was mentioned, along with his relatives and everyone under his lordship, in a peace treaty with Kotor from 1167. Knez Nikola's power and independence was strong enough to have Rogerije, the Archbishop of Split, executed in 1180. Family political influence at that time included Brač and Hvar, Breueco (Brenti, Brevko, Brečko)—also of genus Kačić—as well as the previous Šibenik iupanus (župan). Archbishop Rogerije, who also served Byzantine Emperor Manuel I Komnenos as representative governor of Croatia, had become involved in a dispute about an estate around Mosor. A conte Nicola Aprico, who was identified in two dispute settlements of Split during 1178–79, is considered to be the same knez Nikola. In 1190, Nikola established a peace treaty with Dubrovnik. Like the 1167 treaty with Kotor, the 1190 treaty granted safe and free navigation to Dubrovnik ships from Molunat to Orebić (Trstenica).

The area of Omiš principality seems to have included the islands of Brač, Hvar and Vis, and probably at some point Korčula, but it is uncertain whether the land included coastal Poljica and Žrnovnica to the North and Makarska coast to the South. In the 13th century the center of the principality was Omiš, and with the title of Omiš knez (comes) the sources also mentioned the title of knez for the islands. In the 13th century the terms Kačićs (Kačići) and residents of Omiš (Omišani) are both mentioned, making it sometimes more difficult to reliably identify members of the genus. However, it seems that the princely titles were held only by the Kačićs. They achieved a large degree of independence from the central government and imposed the name of Omiš and Kačić family over the entire region.

Kačićs and Omiš citizens made a peace treaty with Venice in 1208, and the brothers Desislav, Radoš, Dragan, Bogdan and Sinko were mentioned by knez Sebena in the document. However, in February 1215, Kačićs were, for first time, cited for piracy. In 1220, the Hungarian-Croatian king Andrew II threatened retaliation with the royal army against knez Malduč and his relatives unless the piracy and heresy ended. In May 1221, Pope Honorius III sent legate Aconcius to the citizens of Split, among other cities, to prevent piracy and defend the Crusaders. In 1222, the pope sought help from residents of Dubrovnik against the activity of Bosnian heretics and Omiš pirates. His efforts, as well as those of Guncel, Archbishop of Split, resulted in a temporary peace treaty with Kačići Omišani (Cacecli Almesiani).

In 1232, Venetians mentioned that Dubrovnik was not allowed to accept Kačićs and Omišani, and if Venice were to send ships against Kačićs, Dubrovnik must join the Venetians with a ship of at least 50 people.

Nikola of Hodimir and Pribislav of Malduč claimed bail in May 1239 for the Omišani who murdered Dubrovnik nobleman Grubeša and looted his ship. They also agreed to pay compensation for personal property that had been looted. In Omiš during the same year, knez Nikola and his relatives made peace between Zachlumia and Split, agreeing to pay for damage earlier in the year when Malduš nephew Toljen ravaged Split. However, compensation for the ravages of Toljen was not paid, leading to conflict in the following year. After an unsuccessful attack on Omiš, the Split army captured Brač in the first half of 1240. The conflict continued until the peace agreement by which the brothers of Osor left the ships to Split and renounced looting. This was also the time period of the Split potestas Gargano, and Malduč sons Pribislav and Osor in Hvar and Brač.

In March 1244, the Holy Roman Emperor Frederick II threatened conflict with the Omišani over damage incurred along the Apulian coast. In March 1245, knez Nikola of Hodimir, with 100 Omiš citizens and knezes Pribislav, Osor, Juraj, Radoš (son of Bogdan), Slomir, and Prodan (son of Dragan), made a treaty with Dubrovnik. According to the 1245 treaty, if the king called upon the Kačićs and Omišani to help in an attack on Dubrovnik, they would respond with the least possible forces.

In 1252–54, Juraj helped Stefan Uroš I of Serbia in the war with Dubrovnik, as he was married to Stefan's daughter. In 1256, a dispute between knez Osor and the city Trogir about property in the village of Bijaći was resolved by king Béla IV and ban Stjepan. In 1258, when the king confirmed rights to the Omišani, knezes Osor and Radoš were called "kingdom noblemen". Documents from 1261-62 describe an agreement in which Dubrovnik paid blood feud to the relatives of murdered Omišani, who promised not to cause any harm to the Dubrovnik residents. In 1267–68, the Doge warned the citizens of Split about helping Omiš pirates. In 1271, the pirates looted a ship on which the Archbishop of Trani was traveling to Dubrovnik. A similar incident occurred in 1273 when pirates commanded by Stanoj and Saracen looted the ship of bishop Kefalinije Henrik.

Charles I of Naples signed an alliance with Split and Šibenik against Omiš pirates in June and September 1274. The citizens of Omiš responded by an alliance with Venice in August, in accordance with a 20-year peace treaty signed by knezes Radoš, Bogdan, Juraj and Semen. This triggered conflict on the land and sea in 1275. The activities in the intermediate years are unknown, besides that in April 1278 the islands of Hvar and Brač recognized Venetian authority, and the Omiš in 1281.

At the end of the 13th century, the Omiš branch of the Kačić family was involved in the politics of more powerful authorities. Their local hereditary oligarchy disappeared, but the Kačićs probably continued to live in the area. The war with Venice at the end of the 1270s and the beginning of the 1280s led to their loss of Omiš in favor of princes from the Šubić noble family. The Omiš Kačićs are mentioned for the last time in 1294, when the Venetians wrote to Dubrovnik residents seeking compensation from Dubrovnik authorities who had failed to send an armed ship against Omiš pirates. It is not known whether Ivan, son of Matej Kačić, mentioned in Dubrovnik 1285, was related to the Omišani Kačićs. After that, Kačićs are no longer mentioned.

=== Notable members ===
- Nikola Kačić (Nicola kenesius Alemyscii), ruled between c. 1167 and c. 1180.
- Sebena Kačić, Malduč Kačić, Radoš Kačić, Bogdan Kačić
- Juraj or Đuro Kačić, married the daughter of King Stefan Vladislav of Serbia (r. 1234–1243).

== Makarska branch ==
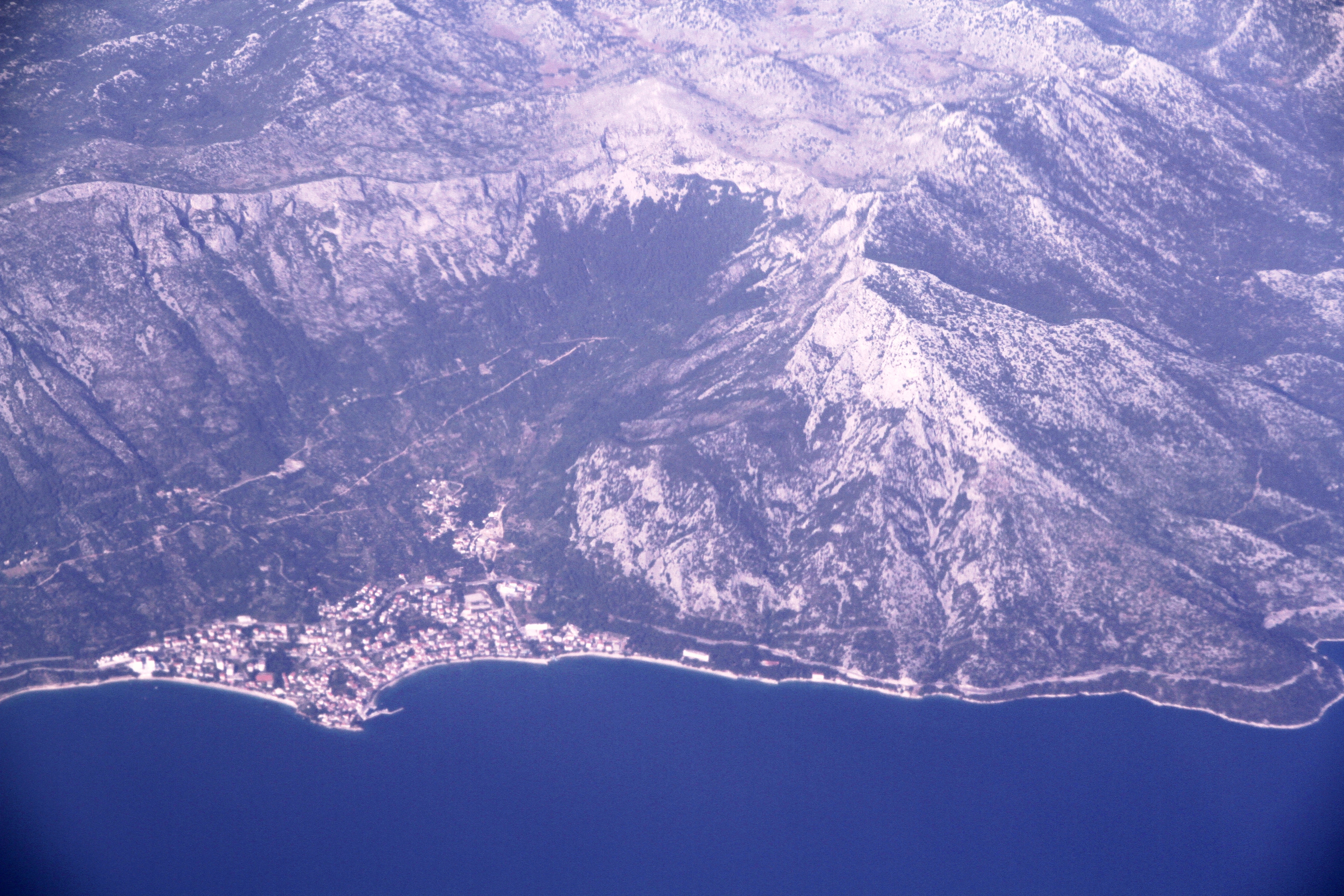
Gradac is naturally protected by Biokovo mountain, making it mainly accessible by the sea.

In 15th-century sources, Kačićs appear in the Makarska Riviera (Krajina), most likely as the descendants of Omiš branch Kačićs. According to the genealogy preserved by the most well known member of the family, Andrija Kačić Miošić, one branch of the family went to Hungary, and there fought with Zagar noble family. They returned to Dalmatia, one brother to Zadar, another to Šibenik, and the last two to the Makarska Riviera, where they started building castles in Gradac and Trpanj, as well as practicing piracy up to Apulia.

The first known member of the Makarska branch was Vrsajko. According to the genealogy, the family branched out from his son Baran (second half of the 14th century). Baran's sons Vukašin, Vukić, Andrijaš and Baran were mentioned in historical documents; Bosnian king Stephen Ostoja, in 1417, confirmed the rights of his vassals Vukašin, Baran and Juraj Vukačić to Makar, Drvenik, Pasičina, Miluse, Lapčanj (Gradac), which were previously confirmed by Bosnian ban Stephen II Kotromanić and Bosnian king Tvrtko I.

In July 1452, Grubiša sought for his family and all residents of Krajina to become Venetian vassals. Venice accepted the request, confirmed their old customs, allowed the foundation of fort and port in Makar, and forgave older violence. Thus, the Kačićs and residents of Krajina fought at their own expense between Neretva and Cetina rivers, and gave taxes to Venice.

A Venetian confidant on Hvar reported, in 1498, the Ottoman preparation of 25 ships for sea attack on Krajina and Kačićs. In the next year, they became Ottoman subjects. In 1500, the Split monarch reported to Venice that Ottomans captured several delegates from Split, and that safely arrived in Mostar only thanks to knez Juraj Marković, an Ottoman subject and Venetian friend. Marković wrote from Makarska to Venice that he was knez for 15 years and always a friend of the Venetians. In the Marković collection and archive, D. Papalić found the Croatian redaction of the Chronicle of the Priest of Duklja.

During the Ottoman rule, Kačićs were only partially mentioned, but still lived there. From the beginning of the 17th century, they can again be traced in the documents, but as family members of several branches descending from the coastal princes. In the 17th and 18th centuries, the family continued to branch out and become independent genera. Their names usually carried a combination with "Kačić", as well had the title of "conte".

According to the genealogy, from Vukašin's sons Vukmir, Grubiša, Radoja and Radonja emerged three branches. Per settlement, Vukmir's descendants are known as Kačićs of Gradac, while those of Radonja and Grubiša are Kačićs of Brist. From the first branch emerged Jurčević, Viskić (Visko), Stipić, Pekić (Peko) and Bartolović (older Sladojević), while from the second branch came Miošić, Aleksić (Alesić), Žarković and Barišić (Barešić). The Kačić-Bartolović or Bartulović branch is a member of Croatian Nobility Association, which was formed in 1995.

Descended from Baran's son Vukić, in Kotišina, were Terzić, Šimunović (extinct in the 17th century), Marković, and probably Begić. From Baran's son Andrijaš emerged Šiljić (Šilje), Perić, Klarević (Čavelić), Baše (Bašić) and Filipčević. Kačićs from Makar divided into Andrijašević and Mitrović. Descended from Baran's son Baran was the family of Baranović.

=== Notable members ===
- Bartul Kačić-Žarković (1572–1645), bishop of Makarska between 1615 and 1645
- Petar Kačić-Šilje (c. 1606–1661), bishop of Makarska between 1646 and 1660
- Pavao Barišić Kačić (died 1721), provincial of Franciscan Province of Bosna Srebrena between 1693 and 1696
- Antun Kačić (1686–1745), bishop of Trogir between 1722 and 1730), and archbishop of Split between 1730 and 1745
- Andrija Kačić Miošić (1704–1760), Franciscan and poet
- Juraj Paškal Terzić Kačić (1740–1820), canon and poet
- Pavao Klement Miošić Kačić (1786–1837), bishop of Split-Makarska between 1829 and 1837
- Petar Peko Kačić (1830–1918), Franciscan and ethnographer

== Hungarian branch ==
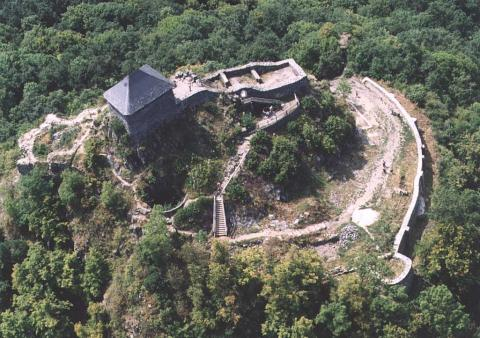
The ruins of Salgó Castle

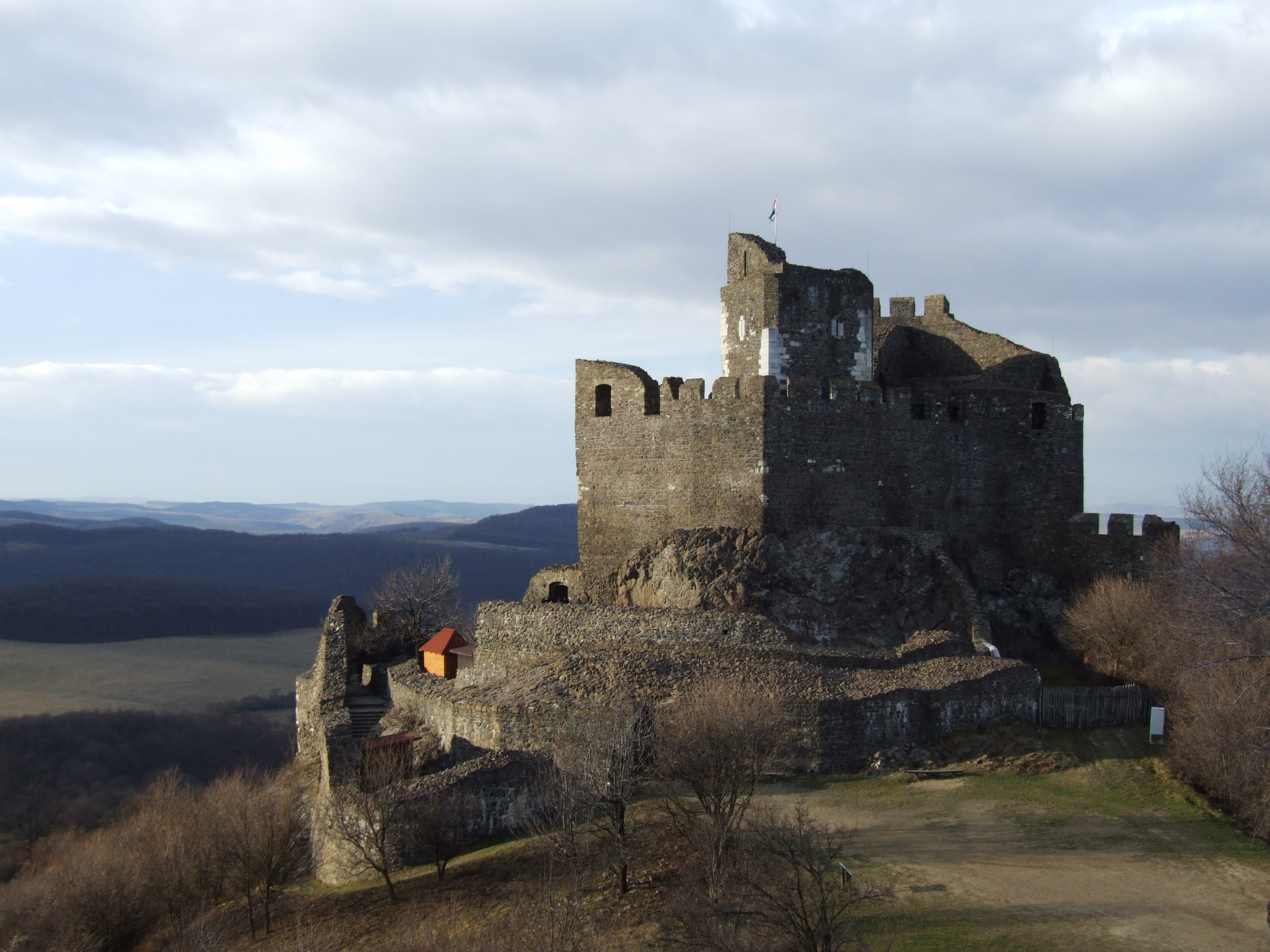
The ruins of Hollókő Castle.

Several scholars considered that Hungarian Kacsics may have been descendants of Omiš Kačićs. They are mentioned in the early 13th century, in Northern counties Nógrád, Salgó and Hollókő.

The first mentioned noblemen are brothers Michael Kacsics and Simon Kacsics, the Voivode of Transylvania (1209–1212; 1215) and Ban of Slavonia (1212; somewhere 1213–1218). Simon took part in the murder of Queen Gertrude of Merania (24 September 1213); therefore, King Andrew II of Hungary confiscated his possessions.

Supporters of Andrew II in his rebellion against the elder brother and then king Emeric may have included the noble family Kačić. With the new king's intention of spreading his circle of supporters, some members of the family were probably gifted with estates in Hungary. A relationship between Hungarian and Omiš Kačićs is identified primarily in the mention of Šimun Kačić in a document from 1178, with father Nikola and brother Jakov, and with brothers Borislav, Bogdan and other family members in a document from 1190.

In the next two or three generations, the genus branched into several lineages and families. First the Zagyvafői, Libercsei, and later Libercsei Tomposi, Libercsei Radó, Füleki, Ozdini, Etre, Kecsői/Berzencei, Hollókői, Salgói, and Bejei. Michael's son Falkos (1255) held properties at Szécsény and Nógrád, and was the founder of genus Libercsei, from which emerged powerful Szécsényi, Geréb of Vingárta, and Farkas of Szeszárme. To the Szécsényi belonged Kónya, Ban of Croatia (1366–67), while to the Geréb belonged Matthias, also Ban of Croatia (1483–92).

The members of the genus accepted the supremacy of Máté Csák III, one of the most powerful oligarchs of the kingdom, around 1300; only one of them, Thomas Szécsényi became the partisan of King Charles I. Consequently, the king granted him his relatives' possessions following victories over the oligarch.

=== Notable members ===
- Michael Kacsics (died after 1228), Voivode of Transylvania between 1209 and 1212, Ban of Slavonia 1212
- Simon Kacsics (died after 1228), Voivode of Transylvania in 1215, Ban of Slavonia in 1213
- Farkas, Master of the cupbearers for the Queen in 1298, father of Thomas Szécsényi
- Simon Kacsics (died after 1327), Count of the Székelys between 1321 and 1327
- Kónya Szécsényi (died after 1367), Ban of Croatia between 1366 and 1367
- Matthias Geréb (died 1489), Ban of Croatia between 1483 and 1489

== See also ==
- Croatian nobility
- List of noble families of Croatia
- Twelve noble tribes of Croatia
