= Hollókő =

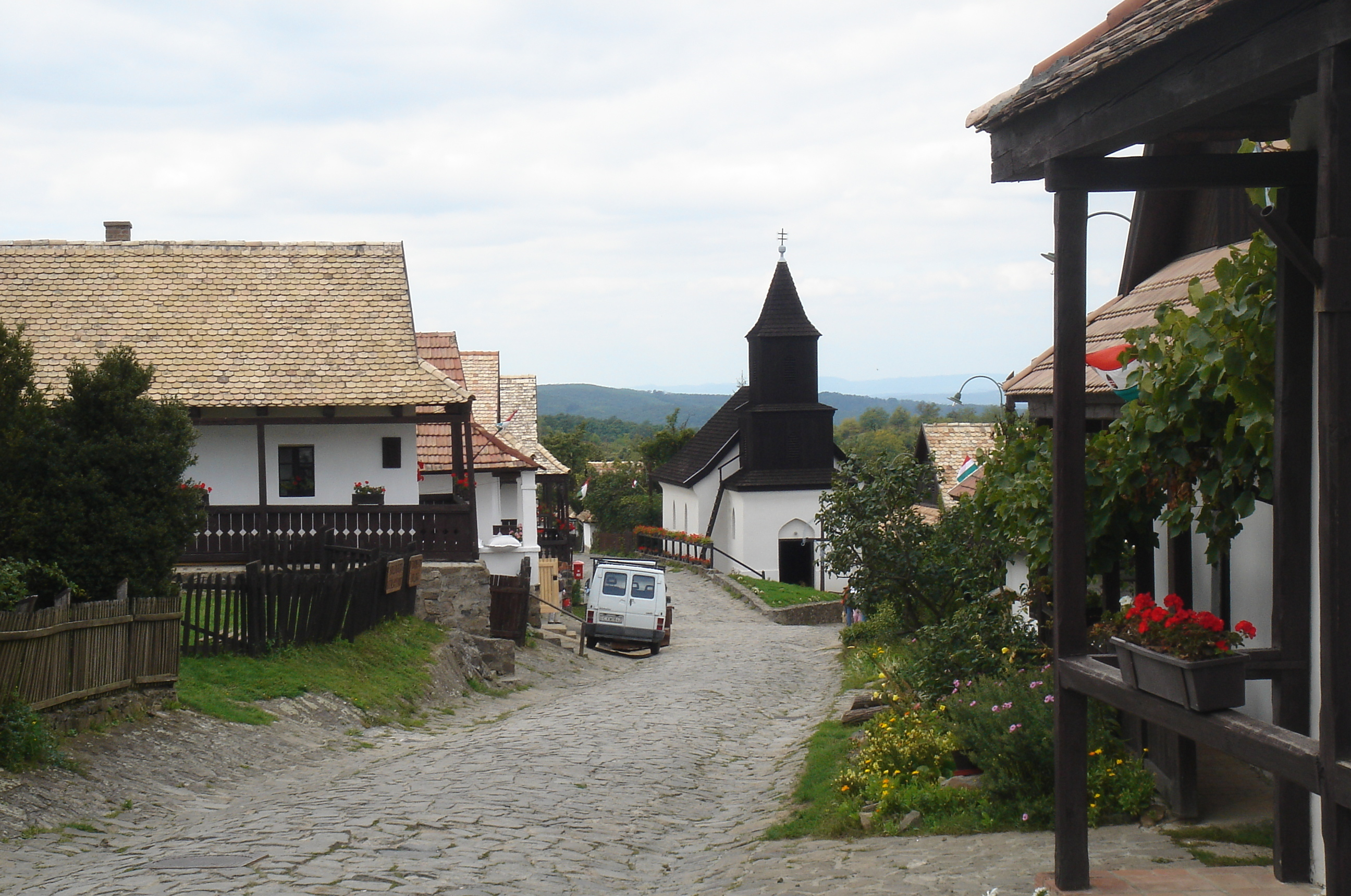

- Location within Hungary Location within Europe
- Coordinates: 47°59′46.32″N 19°35′30.55″E
- Country: Hungary
- County: Nógrád

Area
  - Total: 5.18 km^{2} (2.00 sq mi)

Population (2024)
  - Total: 294
  - Density: 56.8/km^{2} (147/sq mi)
- Time zone: UTC+1 (CET)
  - Summer (DST): UTC+2 (CEST)
- Postal code: 3176
- Area code: 32
- Website: http://www.holloko.hu/

UNESCO World Heritage Site
- Official name: Old Village of Hollókő and its Surroundings
- Type: Cultural
- Criteria: v
- Designated: 1987 (11th session)
- Reference no.: 401rev
- Region: Europe and North America

Hollókő (Hungarian: [ˈholloːkøː]) is a village in northern Hungary, located in Nógrád County. The village, which was constructed in the 13th century and developed in the 18th and 19th centuries, is a well-preserved ethnographic village of the Palóc people, with traditional wooden architecture and layout of buildings, farms, and orchards. Because of its exceptional preservation and testimony to rural life before the arrival of modern farming practices, the village was inscribed as a UNESCO World Heritage Site in 1987. Its name means "Raven-stone" in Hungarian.

== Location ==
The village is located in Nógrád county, approximately 91.1 kilometres northeast of Budapest, the capital of Hungary. It lies in a valley of Cserhát Mountains, surrounded by low peaks. The natural environment is protected.

== History ==
In the middle of the 13th century, in the aftermath of the Mongol invasion, construction of Hollókő castle first began as a means to protect the area against future attacks. At this time, the area around Hollókő was held by the Kacsics noble clan. The castle was first mentioned in records in 1310. The original village (now in ruins) was built just below the castle walls. The Ottomans captured the castle in 1552, and for the next 150 years, control alternated between Ottoman and Hungarian forces. At the end of the Ottoman era (1683), the castle and the village were finally abandoned, and the present town grew up in their place. Many of the existing houses were first built around this time. In 1782, present-day Hollókő was still a one-street village, but during the 18th and 19th centuries, the town expanded, and by 1885, there was no more available land to cultivate or grow into. The houses, which contain wood in their structure, have had to be rebuilt many times throughout the years due to periodic fires, the last being in 1909. In 1987, the village, castle ruins, and surrounding area were inscribed as a UNESCO World Heritage Site.

== Layout and architecture ==
As a protected village, Hollókő retains many of the architectural traditions of the Palóc people. The town blends into traditional strip farming, interspersed by orchards, vineyards, meadows, and woods. According to the Palóc custom, the oldest houses were built on either side of the main street, and subsequent generations built their homes behind them. The barns are located away from the village at the edge of the surrounding fields. The wooden buildings are half-timbered, with whitewashed plaster walls and porches covered by overhanging roofs on the street side.

== Sights ==
- The protected part of the village – Lajos Kossuth and Sándor Petőfi streets, 67 houses
- Village Museum
- Post Museum
- Doll Museum
- Craft Printing Museum
- Hungarian Folk Dance House
- Basket Shop
- Arts & Tea House
- Paloc PlayHouse
- Borpatika
- The House Of The Weavers
- St. Martin Roman Catholic church
- Hollókő castle
- School Master's House (Iskolamester háza)

== Picture gallery ==
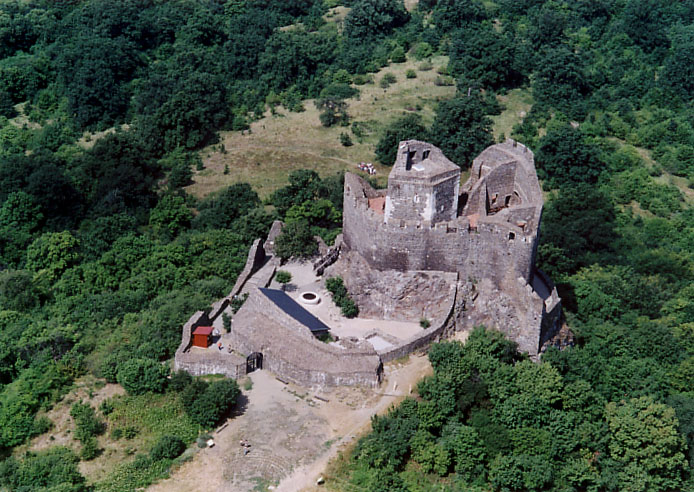
Hollókő castle

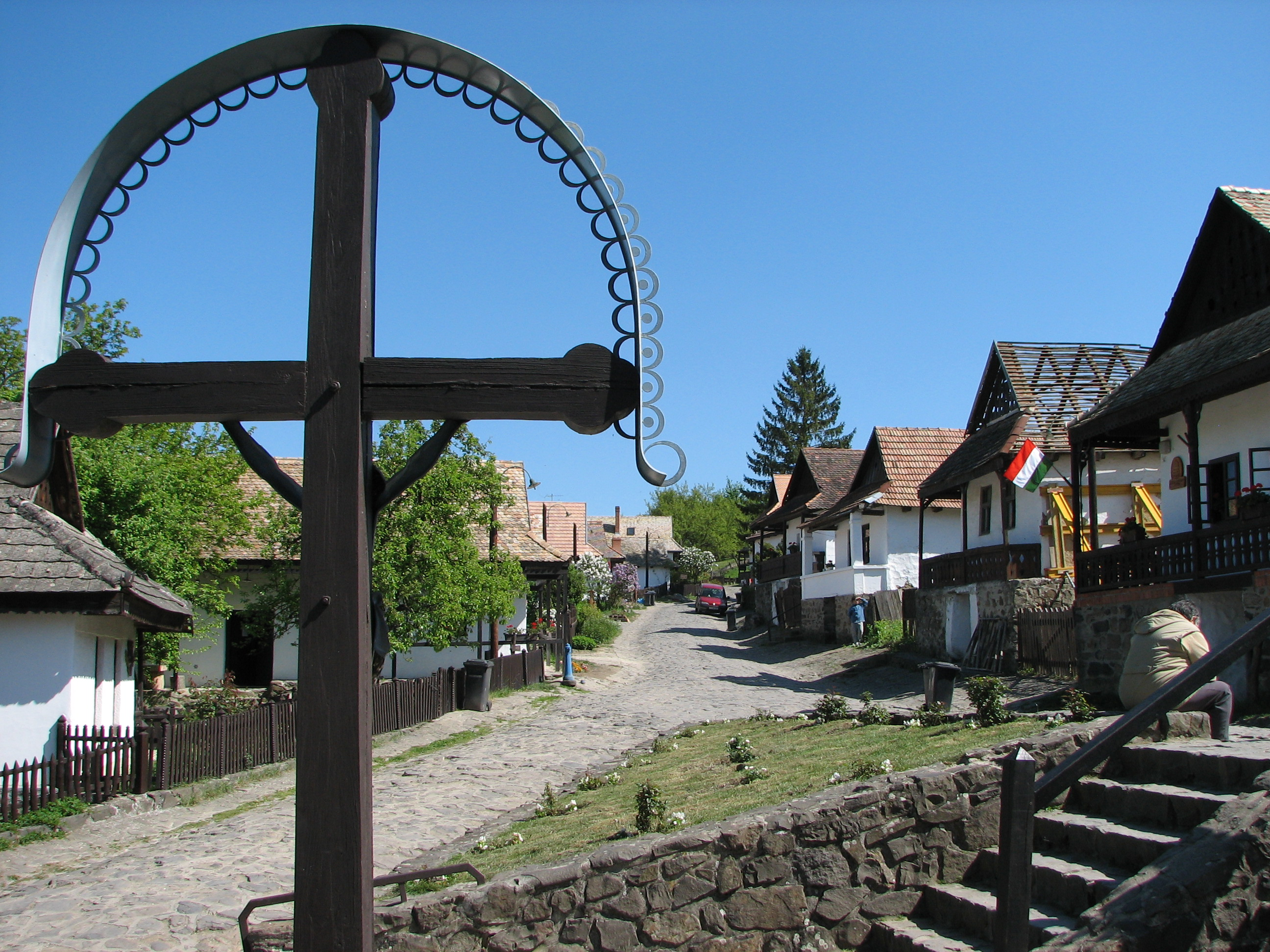
Hollókő village

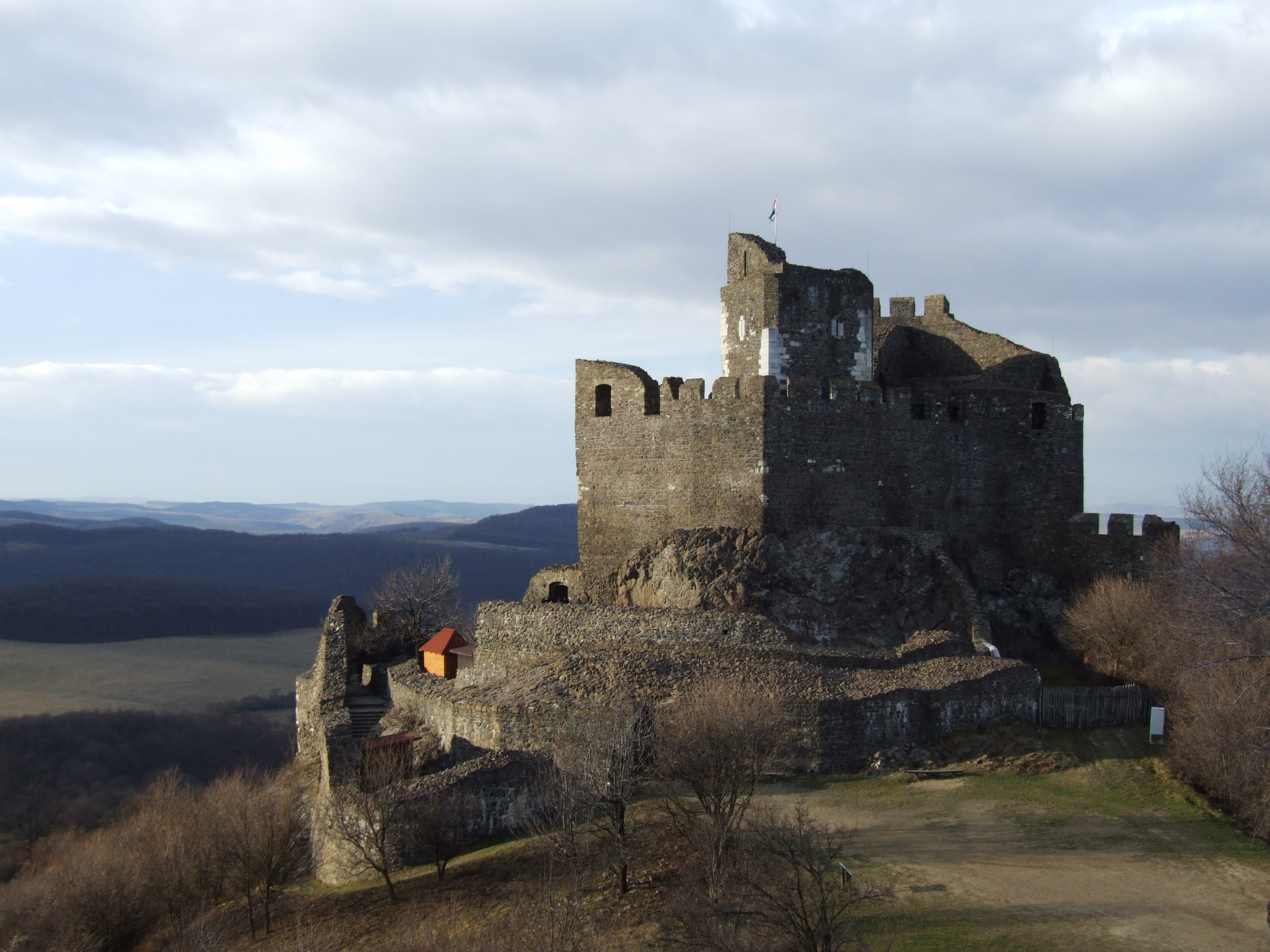
The castle of Hollókő

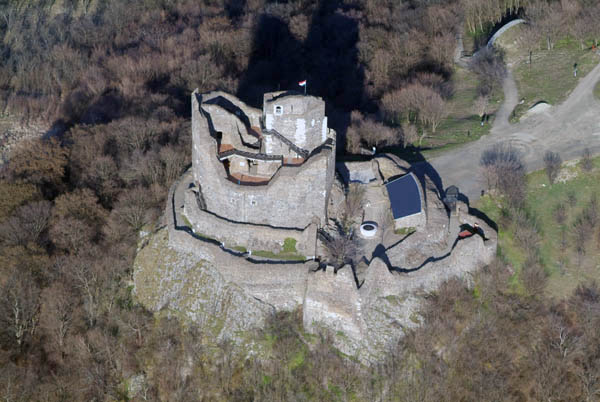
Aerial view of the castle
