= Salgó Castle =

Medieval Hungarian castle

Coordinates: 48°08′41″N 19°50′50″E

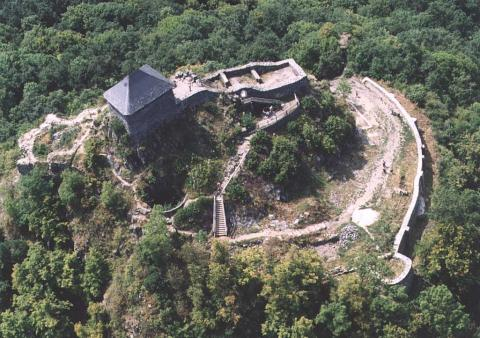
Ruins of Salgó Castle

Salgó Castle is a Hungarian stronghold near Salgótarján, Nógrád county, 120 km from Budapest. Originally built as a tower by the Kacsics clan in the 13th century to withstand the Mongol invasions of the 13th century, it was later renovated into a fortress by King Béla IV. During the Hussite War, the fortress was captured in 1460 and captured again by the Ottoman army in the 16th century. Ownership of the castle eventually passed to Bálint Balassi and his family, one member of the family neglected the castle and left it in ruins. Today Salgó Castle is a well-known tourist spot. Salgó Castle is visible from the towers of nearby Šomoška Castle, across the border in Slovakia.

== History ==
In the beginning it was only a square-shaped stone tower. The meaning behind "Salgó" is 'shine', however it is still not clear whether the name Salgó was the name of the volcanic peak which the castle sits on, or that they started to call the place by this name after the tower was erected.

A fortified tower at first stood on the site of the present-day castle. It was built by the Kacsics clan, who were the lords around these hills in the 13th century. The tower was built because of the recurrent Mongol invasions in 1241 to 1242, since only fortified towns or castles could resist their attacks. Mongols were not capable of sieges. After one invasion, King Béla IV ordered the fortifications of manor houses and towns as well as the building of new strongholds.

Salgó then began development as a small tower (7.5 x 9.5 m) with a small castle-yard. It is thought that the cellar of the tower was used as a prison. A water-collecting cistern was constructed under the tower owing to difficulties with obtaining the water supply on a volcanic rock. This castle had two cisterns and the water was essential, not only for drinking but also fire fighting.

=== 15th century ===
In 1460 the Hussites captured the small fortress of Salgó. King Mathias recaptured it in the same year and gave it to Imre Szapolyai. This period commenced the golden age of Salgó castle. The lower castle-yard was further built and the upper castle-yard became roofed-over and became a living space. The lord of the castle did not live in the castle but his substitute, the castellan lived in the upper yard. In the lower castle-yard there were stables and storehouses.

In the 16th century a huge pentagonal battlement (14 x 15 m) was built in the east side of the rock. Even this reinforced building could not resist an Ottoman attack. Legends were told, that Kara Hamza bey, the governor of Szécsény and Hatvan, took the castle by ruse. He made his soldiers lay tree trunks on to gun carriages and push them under the fortress. The soldiers in the tower thought that the trunks were real cannons as they could not see well in the fog. They then handed over Salgó Castle. In reality the fortress was shelled to ruins by the Ottoman army. They set the artillery on the top of the neighbouring hill, opposite to Salgó called Kis-Salgó (Small-Salgó) or Boszorkánykő (cliff of witches).

Bálint Balassi, the great Hungarian poet, got into the fortress, while the Ottoman army was still stationed in the castle. After his death his sons Bálint and Ferenc Kövér could not decide who was the owner and a long-drawn lawsuit went on between them. In 1593 Michael Pálffy and Christof Tieffenbach reoccupied the castle. Bálint Balassi died in 1594 during the Siege of Esztergom. The nephew of Bálint inherited the ruins of the castle but he left it alone.

=== Modern ===
The ruins became overgrown with grass and shrubs up until the 19th century when Sándor Petőfi another famous Hungarian poet climbed into the ruins of the castle in 1845 the atmosphere of the ruins made him write his romantic poetry called Salgó. This is a tragic story about the Kompolti clan, the lords of Salgó, who tyrannized the region, which were under their power. The story is based on a traditional legend.

Today Salgó Castle is a well-known tourist spot.

== Gallery ==
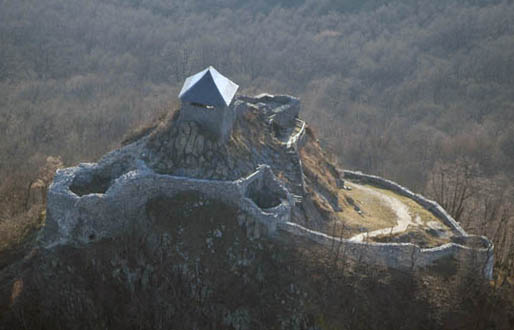

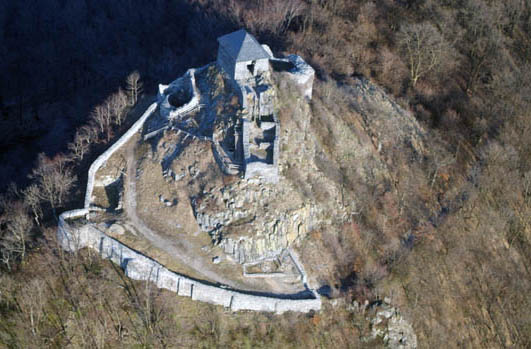

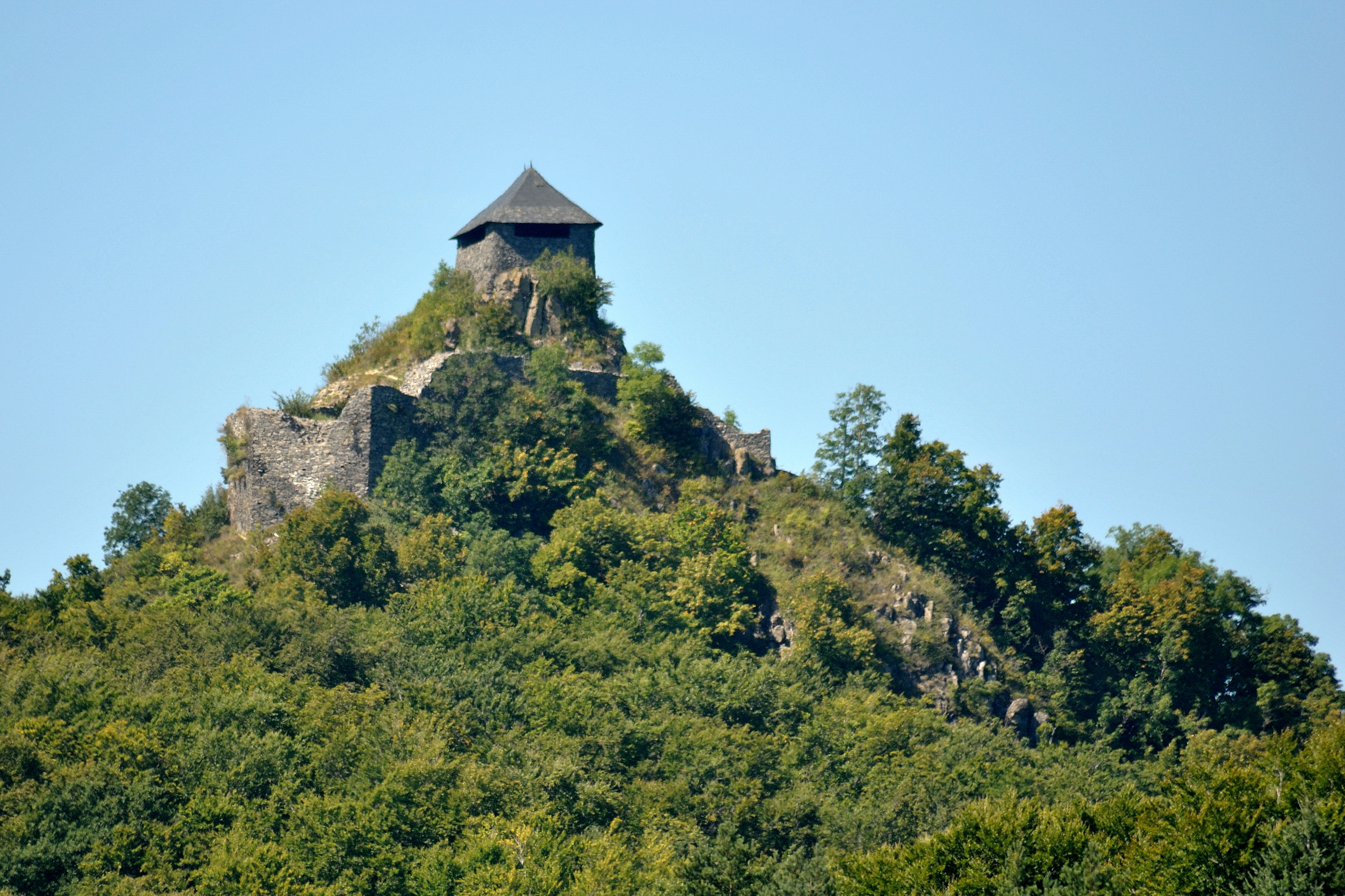

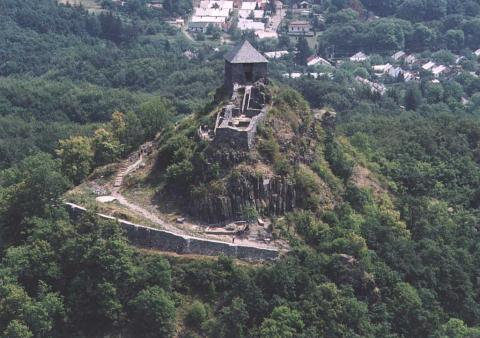

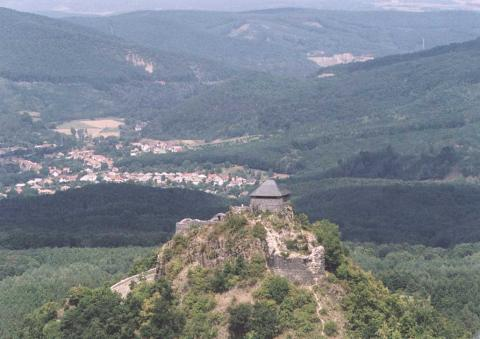
