= Brâncovenești, Mureș =

Brâncovenești Marosvécs
- Commune
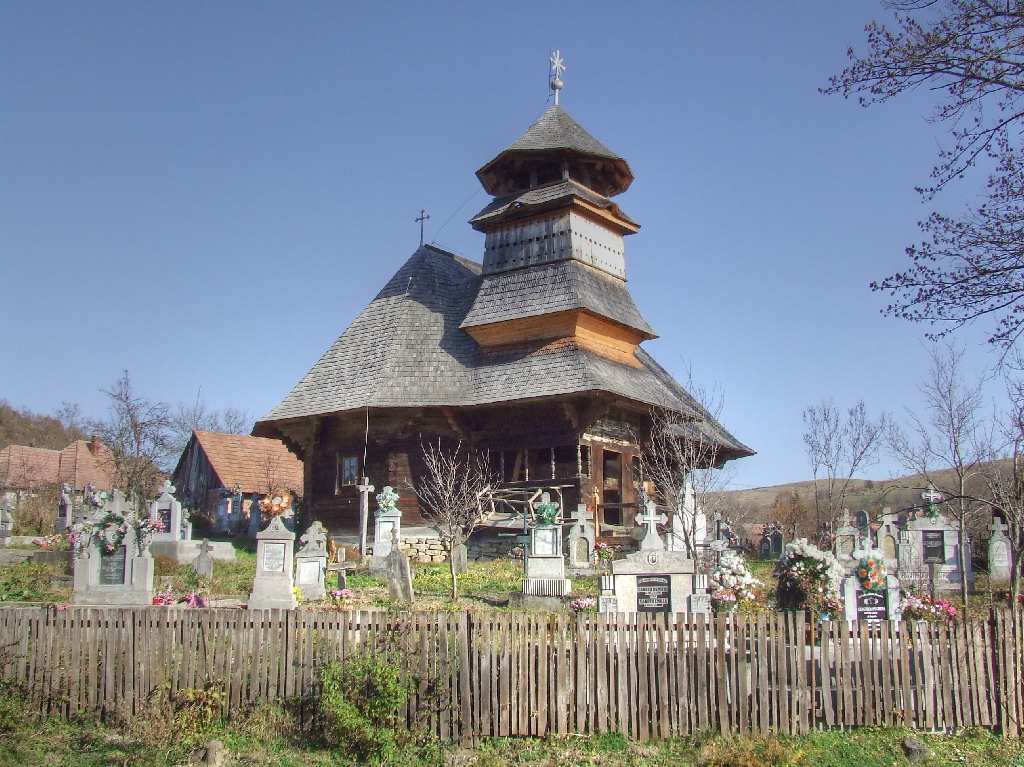
- Wooden church in Săcalu de Pădure

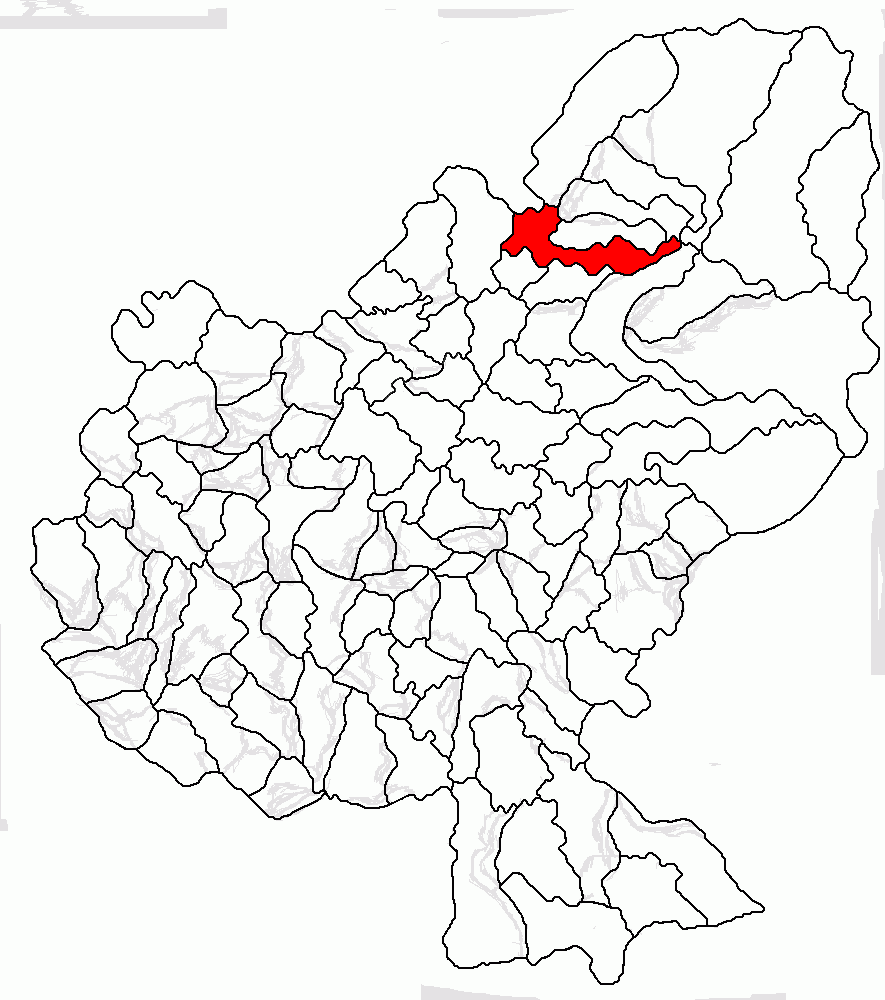
- Location in Mureș County

- Location in Romania
- Coordinates: 46°52′N 24°46′E
- Country: Romania
- County: Mureș

Government
  - Mayor (2024–2028): Ferenc Ördög (UDMR)
- Area: 87.62 km^{2} (33.83 sq mi)
- Elevation: 394 m (1,293 ft)
- Population (2021-12-01): 3,559
  - Density: 40.62/km^{2} (105.2/sq mi)
- Time zone: UTC+02:00 (EET)
  - Summer (DST): UTC+03:00 (EEST)
- Postal code: 547130
- Area code: (+40) 0265
- Vehicle reg.: MS
- Website: primariabrincovenesti.ro

Brâncovenești (formerly Ieciu and Delavrancea; Hungarian: Marosvécs, Hungarian pronunciation: [mɒroʃveːtʃ] or Vécs; German: Wetsch) is a commune in Mureș County, Transylvania, Romania. It is composed of five villages: Brâncovenești, Idicel (Idecspatak), Idicel-Pădure (Erdőidecs), Săcalu de Pădure (Erdőszakál; German: Mausdorf), and Vălenii de Mureș (Disznajó; German: Gassen).

Brâncovenești is the site of the Kemény Castle, which was the only castle in Transylvania to survive the Mongol Invasion of Hungary in 1241–42. At the time, it was referred to as Vécs, and it guarded the salt mines of Gömör.

The route of the Via Transilvanica long-distance trail passes through the villages of Săcalu de Pădure and Brâncovenești.

At the 2021 census, the commune had a population of 3,559; of those, 44.93% were Hungarians, 40.66% Romanians, and 6.27% Roma.

== See also ==
- List of Hungarian exonyms (Mureș County)
