= Hungarian Young Communist League =

Communist youth movement

Hungarian Young Communist League KISZ Hungarian: Magyar Kommunista Ifjúsági Szövetség
- Emblem
- Founded: 21 March 1957
- Dissolved: 22 April 1989
- Headquarters: Budapest, Hungarian People's Republic
- Membership: 800,000
- Ideology: Communism; Marxism-Leninism; Kádárism
- Mother party: Hungarian Socialist Workers' Party
- National affiliation: Patriotic People's Front
- International affiliation: WFDY

The Hungarian Young Communist League (Hungarian: Magyar Kommunista Ifjúsági Szövetség, KISZ) was a communist youth movement in the Hungarian People's Republic that was attached to the ruling Socialist Workers' Party.

== History ==
It was founded on 21 March 1957 (on the anniversary of the Hungarian Soviet Republic's declaration in 1919), following the break of 1956 Hungarian Revolution. It claimed to represent all the country's youth and sought to educate young people politically and to supervise political as well as some social activities for them. KISZ was the most important source of new members for the party. Its organizational framework paralleled that of the Hungarian Socialist Workers' Party and included a congress, central committee, secretariat, and regional and local committees. Membership was open to youth from the ages of fourteen to twenty-six years, but most of the full-time leaders of the organization were well over the age limit. In the 1980s, KISZ had about 800,000 members. Membership was common among students (96% at universities, 75% in high schools) but was lower among young people already working (31%). It was mandatory for university admittance.

In April 1989 delegates to the organization's national congress voted to change the name of the organization to the Democratic Youth Federation (DEMISZ). According to declarations adopted by the congress, the newly refashioned federation would be a voluntary league of independent youth organizations and would not accept direction from any single party, including the Hungarian Socialist Workers' Party. The members of the last KISZ Central Committee, however, filled strategic positions in the economy of the 3rd Hungarian Republic, e.g. Imre Nagy (Caola Inc. CEO), Lajos Csepi (president of the Hungarian Privatization and State Holding Co.), János Gönczi (Malév CEO), Mihály Enyedi-Nagy (founder of Media-ship in 1991), Pál Jendrolovics and Sándor Szórádi (Budapest Investment Inc. CEO), György Szilvásy (Altus Inc. CEO, from 2006 leader of the PM's Office). The former prime minister of Hungary, Ferenc Gyurcsány, had served as the president of the central committee of the University chapter of KISZ between 1988 and 1989. After that the organisation changed to Hungarian Democratic Youth League (Hungarian: Demokratikus Magyar Ifjúsági Szövetség, DEMISZ).
