= Šime Vrsaljko =

Croatian footballer (born 1992)

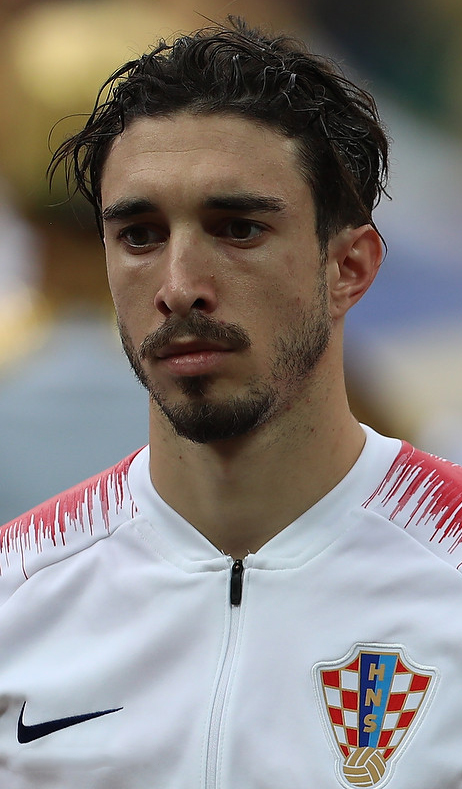
- Vrsaljko with Croatia at the 2018 FIFA World Cup Final

Personal information
- Full name: Šime Vrsaljko
- Date of birth: 10 January 1992 (age 34)
- Place of birth: Rijeka, Croatia
- Height: 1.81 m (5 ft 11 in)
- Position: Right-back

Youth career
- 2006–2009: Dinamo Zagreb

Senior career*
Years	Team	Apps	(Gls)
2009–2013	Dinamo Zagreb	73	(1)
2009	→ Lokomotiva (loan)	17	(0)
2013–2014	Genoa	22	(0)
2014–2016	Sassuolo	57	(0)
2016–2022	Atlético Madrid	70	(1)
2018–2019	→ Inter Milan (loan)	10	(0)
2022	Olympiacos	3	(0)
Total		230	(2)

International career
2007	Croatia U15	5	(1)
2007–2009	Croatia U17	16	(2)
2010	Croatia U18	1	(0)
2010	Croatia U19	6	(0)
2012–2013	Croatia U20	2	(0)
2010–2014	Croatia U21	12	(0)
2011–2022	Croatia	52	(0)
Medal record
Men's football
Representing Croatia
FIFA World Cup
Runner-up	2018 Russia
UEFA European Under-19 Championship
Bronze medal – third place	2010 France
- * Club domestic league appearances and goals

Šime Vrsaljko (Croatian pronunciation: [ʃǐːme ʋr̩sǎːʎko]; born 10 January 1992) is a Croatian former professional footballer who played as a right-back.

Across the span of his 14-year football career, Vrsaljko also played abroad for different clubs in Italy, Spain and Greece, all the way up to his retirement in March 2023.

Vrsaljko made his debut for Croatia in 2011 and went on to represent his country at the UEFA European Championship in 2012, 2016 and 2020, as well as the FIFA World Cup in 2014 and 2018, reaching the final of the latter tournament as runners-up to France.

== Club career ==
=== Early career ===
Vrsaljko started his senior career at Dinamo Zagreb's feeder team, Lokomotiva, where he spent the 2009–10 season training. He debuted for Lokomotiva in the Croatian top level in the match against Rijeka on 26 July 2009 at the age of 17. Vrsaljko was in the starting lineup in each of the 17 Lokomotiva's league matches in 2009, being substituted only once.

=== Dinamo Zagreb ===
He rejoined Dinamo Zagreb's squad on 22 December 2009 before the winter break and appeared in his first match for Dinamo Zagreb on 27 February 2010 against Croatia Sesvete in the Prva HNL. He made nine more appearances by the end of the season for Dinamo, making a total of 27 league appearances throughout the whole season. Vrsaljko also made one appearance in the semi-finals of the 2009–10 Croatian Cup.

Vrsaljko missed the opening matches of the 2010–11 season, as he was called up for international duties with the Croatian under-19 team. He made his first appearance of the season on 31 July in a league match against Rijeka which Dinamo Zagreb lost 2–1. Vrsaljko then made his debut in European competitions, featuring in their defeat to Sheriff Tiraspol in the third qualifying round of the 2010–11 UEFA Champions League. In August that year he was linked with a transfer to Olympique Marseille for a fee of €4 million, but executive vice-president of the club Zdravko Mamić turned down the French club's offer. On 29 August he scored his first league goal for the club in the match against Cibalia which Dinamo Zagreb won 2–0. Due to his impressive performances for Dinamo under the coach Vahid Halilhodžić, he was named Croatian Football Hope of the Year for 2010. By the end of the season, he won the double with Dinamo.

He started the 2011/2012 season by providing an assist for Ivan Krstanović in UEFA Champions League qualifier 3–0 victory against Neftchi Baku in Zagreb. In August 2011, he was sent off during the away match of 2011–12 UEFA Champions League play-off round against Malmö FF, as Dinamo managed to qualify for their first UEFA Champions League in 12 years. He was banned with 3 matches absence in Champions League. He made his 2011–12 UEFA Champions League debut on Matchday 4 against AFC Ajax, and made another appearance in the final match against Olympique Lyonnais on Maksimir Stadium. In domestic league, he made 22 league appearances and provided 5 assists in process, as Dinamo won another double – Prva HNL and Hrvatski kup titles.

After his return from Poland, where he was a part of Croatian team at UEFA Euro 2012, he helped Dinamo to qualify for another UEFA Champions League. He made 4 appearances as right full-back in 2012–13 UEFA Champions League as Dinamo finished bottom of their group with only one point. He also made 25 league appearances, providing three assists.

=== Genoa ===
On 12 July 2013, Vrsaljko joined Serie A side Genoa for €4.6 million. In his first season in the Italian top flight, Vrsaljko was a frequent member of the starting XI, playing in various roles on the right flank – including right-back and right wing. He made 22 appearances in total, missing rounds 24–33 through injury.

=== Sassuolo ===
On 22 July 2014, Vrsaljko signed for Serie A side Sassuolo for €3.5 million plus bonuses of €2 million. He became a key part of Sassuolo's defence under manager Eusebio Di Francesco, and eventually helped the team to achieving their first ever Europa League qualification after finishing 6th in Serie A courtesy of a Juventus Coppa Italia win over Milan as Milan would have gone to Europe instead if they had won the final.

=== Atlético Madrid ===
Vrsaljko signed for La Liga club Atlético Madrid in 2016 on a five-year deal, which was extended for another year on 5 February 2018.

On 16 May 2018, Vrsaljko started the Europa League final as Atlético won the title.

==== Loan to Inter Milan ====
On 31 July 2018, Vrsaljko joined Italian side Inter Milan on an initial one-year loan with the option to buy. On 27 January 2019, Vrsaljko was ruled out for at least six months, due to left knee ligaments surgery.

==== Return from loan ====
On 26 January 2020, he started his first game after being a year out against Leganés that ended up as a goalless draw. He was subbed off for Ivan Šaponjić in 88th minute. On 18 February, he started the home leg of the Champions League round-of-16 fixture against ruling champions Liverpool that ended up as a 1–0 victory. On 10 August, Atlético announced that Vrsaljko and teammate Ángel Correa were both positive for COVID-19, ruling them out of the team's quarter-final fixture against RB Leipzig.

After undergoing another knee surgery during summer, Vrsaljko finally returned to the pitch on 16 December, when he scored in a Copa del Rey 3–0 victory over Cardassar.

=== Olympiacos ===
On 2 July 2022, Vrsaljko moved to Super League Greece club Olympiacos on a free transfer, signing a three-year deal. He made his debut for the club on 20 July in a Champions League qualifier against Maccabi Haifa that ended as a 1–1 draw. However, on 21 November 2022, Vrsaljko's contract was terminated by mutual agreement.

=== Retirement ===
On 23 March 2023, Vrsaljko announced his retirement from professional football at the age of 31, ending a 14-year long career with 346 total appearances made for club and country.

== International career ==
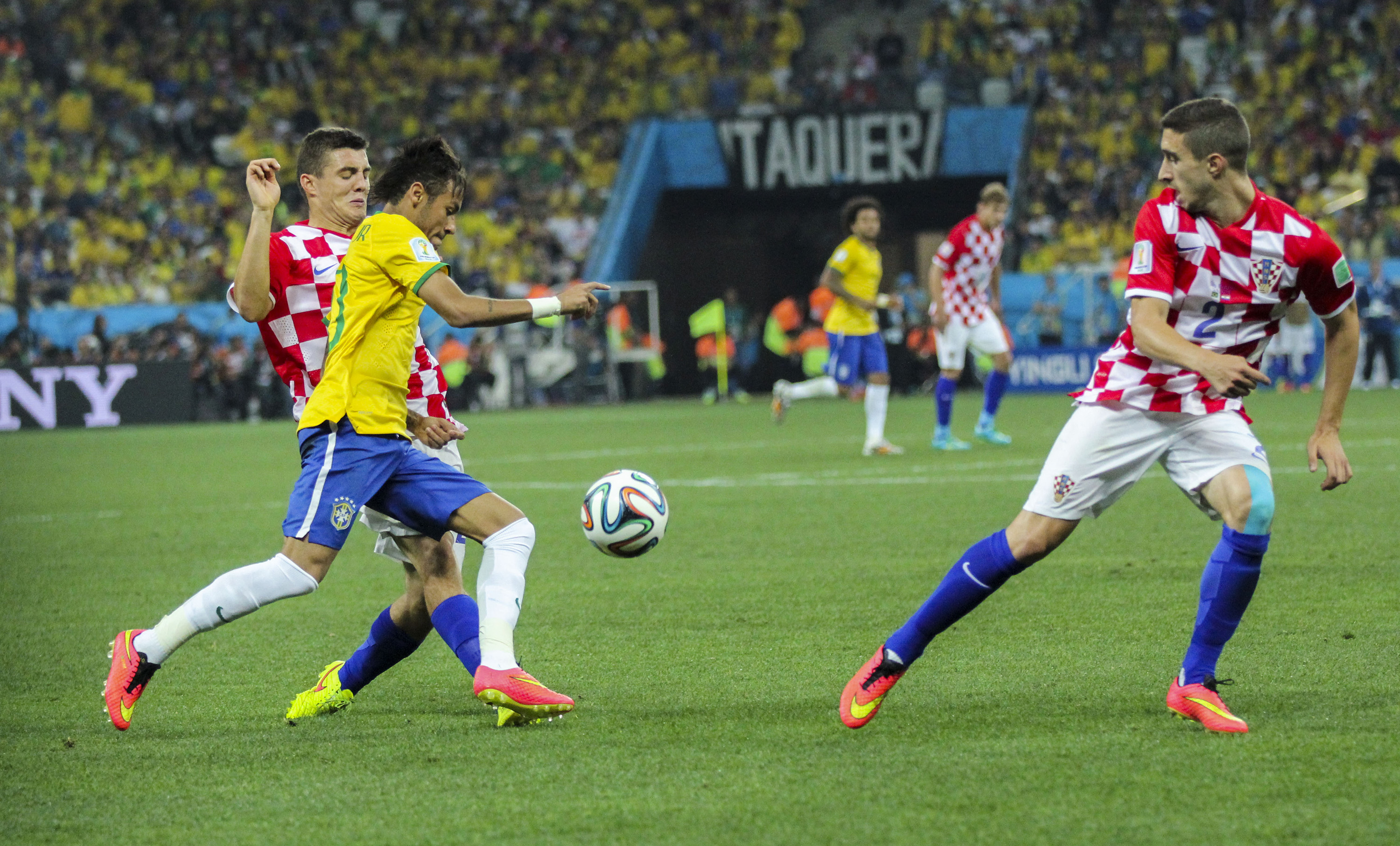
Vrsaljko (right) playing against Brazil at the 2014 FIFA World Cup

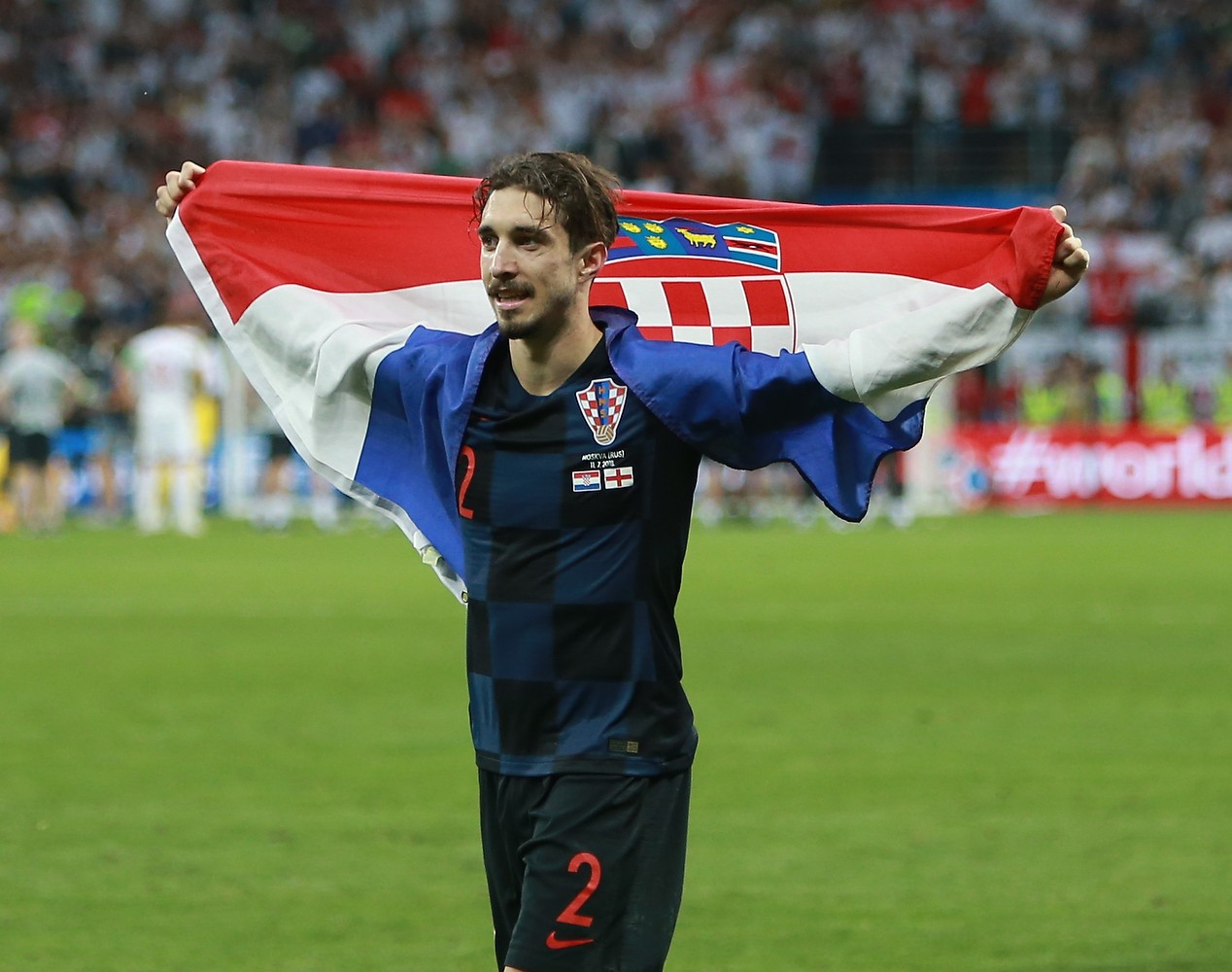
Vrsaljko at the 2018 FIFA World Cup

He received his first call-up to the Croatia national football team on 2 November 2010 for the Euro 2012 qualifier against Malta. He made his national team debut on 9 February 2011 in a friendly match versus the Czech Republic. He made 3 more appearances before May 2012, when he was named in Croatia 26 players preliminary squad for UEFA Euro 2012. After the friendly match against Estonia in May 2012, Croatia manager Slaven Bilić withdrew him from the final list for UEFA Euro 2012. However, just a week after being withdrawn from the final list, he was called up again due to injury of Hamburger SV player Ivo Iličević. He was an unused substitute in all three Croatia matches at the tournament.

During the 2014 FIFA World Cup qualifying phase he made only one appearance, in the match against Belgium in Zagreb. In May 2014 he was named in Croatia 23-man squad for the 2014 FIFA World Cup in Brazil. Due to injuries of in Croatian squad just before the opening match against Brazil, Vrsaljko filled in at the left-back position instead of injured Danijel Pranjić. He reprised his role as a left back in the decider against Mexico, that ended as a 3–1 defeat and saw Croatia eliminated.

On 12 November 2014, at the age of 22, he was the captain of the national team in a 2–1 loss against Argentina, playing for the entire game. He became one of the youngest captains in the history of the national team, with Darijo Srna being rested for the game against Italy.

In May 2018, he was named in Croatia's squad for the 2018 FIFA World Cup in Russia. He started in six of the seven matches in the team's runners-up finish. He also took part in three of the four matches in the inaugural edition of the Nations League, missing the home fixture against England, that ended up as a goalless draw, due to a knee injury.

In September 2020, Vrsaljko came back to the national team after almost two years of absence due to knee surgery. He was named in coach Zlatko Dalić's Nations League fixtures against Portugal and France. However, Vrsaljko did not play a single minute until a 2022 World Cup qualifier against Slovenia on 24 March 2021, which Croatia lost 1–0. The defeat was his first game for the national team in 28 months. However, his underwhelming performances caused Dalić to drop him from the starting XI in favour of Josip Juranović ahead of Croatia's Euro 2020 match against Scotland, and drop him from the team completely ahead of Croatia's September World Cup qualifiers against Russia, Slovakia and Slovenia.

He would go on to make one last appearance for the national team on 10 June 2022 in the 1–0 Nations League victory over Denmark, before permanently retiring from international football on 26 August. He earned a total of 52 caps, scoring no goals.

== Personal life ==
Vrsaljko's great-grandfather was killed by the Yugoslav Partisans in World War II when his paternal grandfather, whom Vrsaljko was named after, was only several months old. When his grandfather died, he was buried with Vrsaljko's Croatia national team jersey. Vrsaljko's father Mladen was also a footballer who played for NK Zadar from 1992 to 1995, and his paternal uncle Svemir is a former deputy mayor of Benkovac, who served as a commander of special unit force "Poskoci" (Long-Nosed Vipers) during the Croatian War of Independence. Vrsaljko was born in 1992 in exile in Rijeka due to bombing of his hometown of Zadar. His family returned to Zadar and nearby Nadin, where his father hails from, upon the end of the war. His mother Branka (née Ćelić) hails from Dračevac Ninski near Poličnik.

In June 2017, Vrsaljko married his high school love Matea Kedžo. On 6 June 2018, the young couple got their first child, a son. In mid April 2022, Vrsaljko had his second child, a daughter, from an extramarital affair with Slovenian model Kaja Vidmar. It is believed that he separated from Kedžo in the beginning of that year. In late 2023, Vrsaljko and Vidmar welcomed their second child together, a son. In August 2026, the two married in a secret ceremony in Petrčane.

In January 2019, a photograph of Vrsaljko lying on a Croatian flag on the field of the Luzhniki Stadium after the 2018 World Cup semi-final match against England, taken by Drago Sopta, was chosen as the fourth most beautiful one in the world by AIPS. Croatian media dubbed the photograph as "legendary". When asked about its background, Vrsaljko has said:

I was more like tired and exhausted from everything so I felt like lying down a bit and taking a rest.

== Career statistics ==
=== Club ===
Appearances and goals by club, season and competition
Club	Season	League			National cup		Europe		Other		Total	
Club	Season	Division	Apps	Goals	Apps	Goals	Apps	Goals	Apps	Goals	Apps	Goals
Lokomotiva (loan)	2009–10	Prva HNL	17	0	0	0	–		–		17	0
Dinamo Zagreb	2009–10	Prva HNL	10	0	0	0	–		–		10	0
Dinamo Zagreb	2010–11	Prva HNL	16	1	0	0	8 (Note: One appearance in UEFA Champions League, seven appearances in UEFA Europa League)	0	–		24	1
Dinamo Zagreb	2011–12	Prva HNL	22	0	0	0	8 (Note: Appearances in UEFA Champions League)	0	–		30	0
Dinamo Zagreb	2012–13	Prva HNL	25	0	0	0	7	0	–		32	0
Dinamo Zagreb	Total		73	1	0	0	23	0	–		96	1
Genoa	2013–14	Serie A	22	0	1	0	–		–		23	0
Sassuolo	2014–15	Serie A	22	0	1	0	–		–		23	0
Sassuolo	2015–16	Serie A	35	0	1	0	–		–		36	0
Sassuolo	Total		57	0	2	0	–		–		59	0
Atlético Madrid	2016–17	La Liga	14	0	6	1	5	0	–		25	1
Atlético Madrid	2017–18	La Liga	21	0	3	0	5 (Note: One appearance in UEFA Champions League, four appearances in UEFA Europa League)	0	–		29	0
Atlético Madrid	2019–20	La Liga	5	0	0	0	2	0	0	0	7	0
Atlético Madrid	2020–21	La Liga	9	0	1	1	0	0	–		10	1
Atlético Madrid	2021–22	La Liga	21	1	2	0	5	0	1 (Note: Appearance in Supercopa de España)	0	29	1
Atlético Madrid	Total		70	1	12	2	17	0	1	0	100	3
Inter Milan (loan)	2018–19	Serie A	10	0	1	0	2	0	–		13	0
Olympiacos	2022–23	Super League Greece	3	0	0	0	6 (Note: Two appearances in UEFA Champions League, four appearances in UEFA Europa League)	0	–		9	0
Career total			230	2	15	2	48	0	1	0	294	4

=== International ===
Appearances and goals by national team and year
National team	Year	Apps	Goals
Croatia	2011	3	0
Croatia	2012	1	0
Croatia	2013	1	0
Croatia	2014	5	0
Croatia	2015	5	0
Croatia	2016	11	0
Croatia	2017	6	0
Croatia	2018	13	0
Croatia	2019	0	0
Croatia	2020	0	0
Croatia	2021	6	0
Croatia	2022	1	0
Total		52	0

== Honours ==
Dinamo Zagreb

- Prva HNL: 2009–10, 2010–11, 2011–12, 2012–13
- Croatian Cup: 2010–11, 2011–12

Atlético Madrid

- La Liga: 2020–21
- UEFA Europa League: 2017–18

Croatia

- FIFA World Cup runner-up: 2018

Individual

- Croatian Football Hope of the Year: 2010
- Croatian First Football League Team of the Year: 2012–13
- FIFA FIFPro World XI 5th team: 2018
- Honorary citizen of the Zadar County: 2019
- City of Zadar Award: 2018

Orders

- Order of Duke Branimir: 2018
