= Lapčan family =

Lapčan
- Croatian & Hungarian noble family
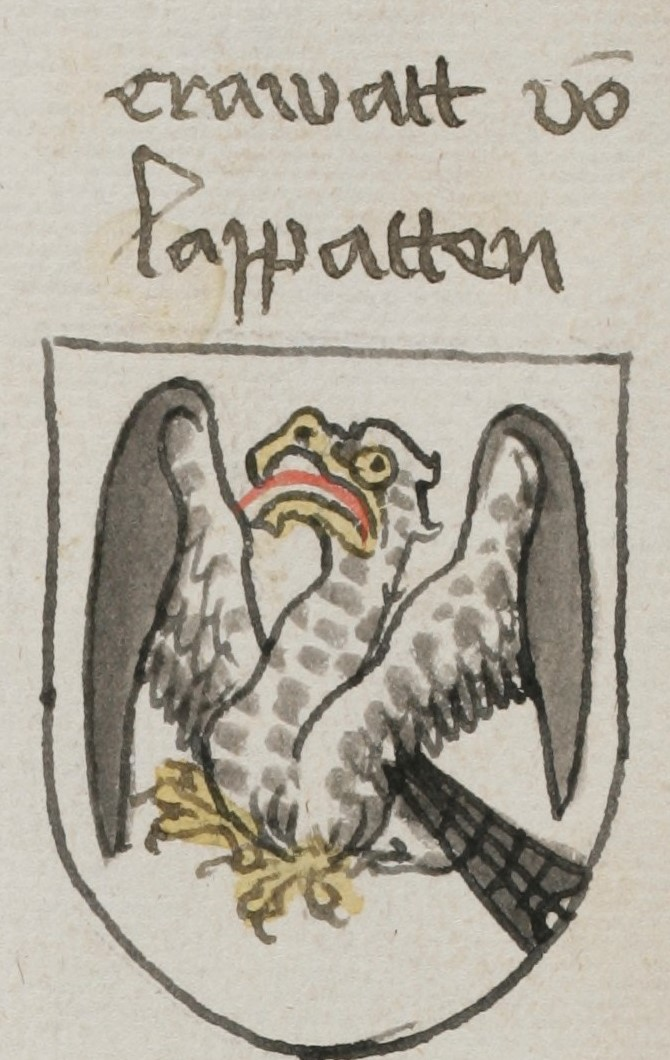
- Coat of arms from St. Gallen-Haggenberg (1470-90s)
- Country: Vassal to Kingdom of Croatia (1102–1526); Vassal to Kingdom of Hungary (1102–1526)
- Founded: 11th century
- Titles: Župan, Comes, Knez
- Traditions: Roman Catholic
- Estate: List: Lapac, Karin etc.
- Cadet branches: List: Lapčan: Oršić, Utješinović etc. Karinjani: Petrušević, Dražetić, Božičković, Korlatović etc.

The Lapčan family (Croatian: Lapčani, German: Lappatten, Lapitz, Latin: de genere Lapxanorum, Lapzanorum, Lapzanorum de Charino, Lapçanorum, Lapcanin, Lapçane, Lapchane, Lapuch, Lapach, Lapech, Lapcinich) was one of the twelve noble tribes of the Kingdom of Croatia, mentioned in the Pacta conventa. Their seat was in the town of Lapac in the former Luka županija, Dalmatia. Their noble rights were confirmed in the second half of the 13th century until when were jobbágy. In the 14th century branched Karinjani, with seat in Karin, whose name would eventually become more dominant than of Lapčan. The family's coat of arms is described in the 15th century and united with the one by Kurjaković family in the mid-17th century, it became used by the Austrian-Bavarian Sinzendorf noble family.

== Etymology ==
The family's name etymology is unknown, it possibly derives from a toponym Lapac, and the original tribal has long been forgotten. Branimir Gušić tried to relate it to the river Labe from where the White Croats allegedly emigrated.

== Coat of arms ==
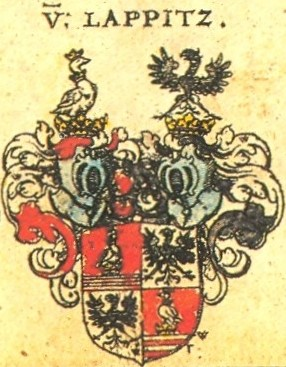
The Lapčan (right) and Kurjaković (left) joint coat of arms, from Siebmachers Wappenbuch in 1605.

The Lapčan's coat of arms was initially mentioned and described in German-Swiss armorials from the late 15th century, in the Jörg Rugen's Wappenbuch from 1493–1499, and St. Gallen-Haggenberg by Ulrich Rösch (1426–1491) the abbot of Saint Gall which German and Swiss border coat of arms were drawn by Hans Haggenberg in the 1490s. In them are mentioned as die krabatten or crawatt von Lapitz or Lapatten, meaning "Croats of Lapčan". According to them the coat of arms had a "natural grey and rising" eagle, described as "eagle naissant" or "falcon rising", with "no crest ornament". These characteristics as a symbol of ancestry can be found in the coat of arms of younger noble families of Bobolić, Čegel, Dobrečić, Oršić, and Utješenić.

Due to this marriage relationships, the coat of arms of both Lapčan and Kurjaković family by female line became part of the Austrian-Bavarian noble family of Sinzendorf. This happened by marriage of Ivan Lapčanin and Klara Torkvat Kurjaković, sister of Ivan Karlović, whose daughter Amalia de Lapitz married into Trauttmansdorff noble family, whose granddaughter Susanna married Pilgram II. von Sinzendorf. During the time of grand-grandson Georg Ludwig von Sinzendorf (1616–1681), by a 1648 decree of Ferdinand III, Holy Roman Emperor, the coat of arms of Lapčan and Kurjaković family got officially united and mostly in this form were used by the Sinzendorf's family on many portraits, engravings, and money coins.

== History ==
It is considered that the tribe originates from Lapac in the former Lučka županija of the region of Dalmatia, to whom is also related the fortified town of Lapac, Lapačka župa and Lapačko polje ("Lapac field") in the region of Lika. As part of dual economy consisting of transhumance and Mediterranean agriculture the second Lapac was probably the tribe's summer estate.

It is considered that the first known member is Vniha Lapčan (Vunycha, Vonycha, Vnicha, Vnyche de Lapuch), who married the Croatian princess Klauda, daughter of King Demetrius Zvonimir (1075–1089). For this marriage, he was supposedly given estates in Karin, Dalmatia. The story is recorded in the 14th century, but it is considered it has historical authenticity. Another possible early ancestor of the genus is župan Martin from Karinjan and Lapčan, inferred as the son of the couple above in some primary sources, and who was one of the twelve noblemen mentioned in Pacta conventa (1102) that negotiated with Coloman, King of Hungary. Older historians related him to Martin Lapsanović who allegedly received by King Coloman the Cetina županija in 1105.

The tribe's certain mention is since the mid-12th century, specifically, 1166 when are recorded Stanče Petrov and Berinja Črnotin as witnesses about Church of St. Chrysogonus from Zadar and settlement of Kamenjane. Due to court dispute with the church, and inheritance of Stanče's grandfather Pripko, in 1181 got as heirdom village Kokićane. In 1183, the tribal members were building a Church of St. John the Baptist in Lapac. Since the first half of the 13th century is recorded constant dispute with the Church of St. Chrysogonus from Zadar regarding the proprietorship of the village Kokićane, which in 1239 the Venetian knez of Zadar gave to the Church, nor was confirmed by Louis I of Hungary in 1360.

In 1258, Bogdan and Stanislav of Hreljin as well Stipan and Radovan of Bogdoslav for their service to the knez Ladislav Gusić of Krbava received village Gomiljane in former Bužani županija (located in Central-Southern Lika). In 1263, nobles from Lapac were accused of disrupting freedom of a king's fort subjects but were defended at the court by Ban of Slavonia, Roland I Rátót, because of their loyalty, settling boundary areas and their low number. It concluded with confirmation of their noble rights by King Béla IV of Hungary. In 1294, Gruban of Stjepan sold some lands near Una. In the area of Drežnik županija they were vassals of the Babonić family, with the last mention being in 1292. In 1322, King Charles I confirmed the 1263 royal document and gave the tribal representatives Petar Giruzlov, Mihovil Heljin, and Stojko even more privileges and rights which would be confirmed by subsequent kings. In 1334, was confirmed estate Grabrovnik in Lapačko polje to Vuk Hemov and brothers Jurko and Hem of Hemin by the nobles from Kurjaković family (a branch of Gusić's). In the hinterland of Zadar, since 1361 were recorded as witnesses of the dispute about Kokićane, buying land in the same village and Butinci, as citizens of Zadar and so on.

In the 14th century the Lapčan members, and Karinjani, estates mostly were in the županija of Luka, specifically Dobruća Vas, Mogorova Dubrava, Dolčani, Dragine, Lemeševo Hrašće, and Karin, as well as Draginići, Snojaci, Podnadin (Dubčane, Vitorišćina, Butinci), Polači, Moklama, Tihlić, Jagodno, Meljača, Kačina Gorica, Podbrižane, Visočane, Murvica, Sonković, Topolje, Slano, Vukšić, Blato, Karli, Borlić. Some moved to the city of Zadar and became citizens. It is assumed to have been closely related to Kačić family because in 1355 at Podnadin is mentioned Lapčić de genere Cachichorum. Some branches emigrated to Pounje - former Pset županija, the last mention being in 1447, and 1490 in Bužani. In the hinterland of Zadar are mentioned for the last time in 1460. During the Ottoman Empire's conquest, their Dalmatian territories got abandoned.

According to Vjekoslav Klaić, the 15th century families who descended from them are: Baldačić, Boričević, Božilović, Čibudinić, Čulić, Grgurić, Hrvatin, Hvaoković, Karlović, Kenlić, Krčelić, Lapić, Livac, Lučić, Mečar, Mrmonjić, Murtilić, Našmanić, Račečević, Ratković, Silić, Staničković, Starički, Strižić, Tulavčić, Utišenić and Vojslavić, who lived in the villages of Strižiće, Blizane, Brgud, Drihovo, Glavace, Dobričeviće and Konjščane, as well forts suburb of Rmanj (Konuba), Ostrovica, and Lapac. Until the beginning of the 16th century, descendants of the Lapčan's from Gomiljane spread to near Vasca and branched to many families, including Dobrečić, Jarić, Culić, Rošković, Budisavljević, Jandrij, Tunko, Kraljić, Krznarić, Mavar and Lučković mentioned in 1501 and 1508. Also, from the Lapčan family allegedly originated the Oršić and Utješinović noble families.

=== Notable members ===
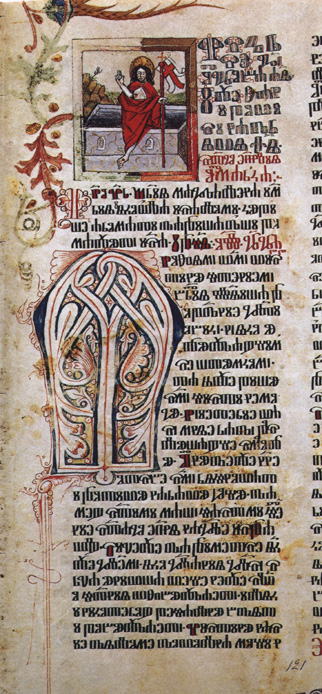
Page of Drugi Novljanski Brevijar by Priest Martinac from 15th century.

- Priest Martinac, a Croatian Glagolithic scribe from Grobnik, calligraphist and illuminator from the 15th century. Considered to be the founder of Croatian patriotic poetry.

== Karinjani branch ==
Although already in the 11th century the branch could have been formed, they are clearly differentiated in the mid-14th century. In 1350 document from Vrana were mentioned Ivan son of Disoje, Jakov of Grgur, and Stjepan of Mrdeša, whom all were from Karin. A year later, in the Croatian nobility's Sabor at Podbrižane, was mentioned comes and royal official Našman, son of Petruš son of Jurislav from Karin, to whom estates in Draginići were given to Franjo Draginić from Draginić noble family, and replaced with estates in Dobruča Vas by knez Nikola or Novak from Bribir. Petruš's descendants would be also called as Petrušević or Petrišević.

In 1360 royal document by King Louis I of Hungary, was fully confirmed the possession of the estates in Karin by the Lapčan family, represented in front of Queen Elizabeth by Našman, Jurislav son of Slovinja, Radoslav of Marin, Ivan of Matija, Radoslav of Ivan, and Mladen of Grgur. They substantiated their rights with the King Zvonimir's grant to Vniha Lapčan and that they are "its true heirs and successors". After this, that branch separated and began calling themselves "Karinjani", literally meaning "of Karin", also recorded in Latin: de genere Carinorum, de genere Charin, de genere Chorin, de genere Quirinorum, de Quirino, generacio Karinorum, generatio Quirinich, generatio nobilium Karinani. Direct descendants from these noblemen can be followed in historical sources and by 14th and 15th century branched into several families, including Našmanić, Bumbić, Borinić, Korlatović, Slavutinić, Stipković, Dražetić, Božičković, Oplanović, Marković, Žuvelić, Mrdešić, Marinić and Matijašević, and possibly Dujmović and Matanić.

Between 1379 and 1416, when deceased, a prominent individual was Vladiha of Juraj of Petruš, who had a house in Zadar, estates in Karin's district and Zadar's hinterland, and served as a judge of a noble table in Podgrađe. In 1433, noble sworn judge of Luka županija was Pavao Korlat. In 1444, representatives of Tihlić, Ivan Marinović, Mihovil Korlatović, Nikola Dražetić and Ratko Božičković went to Zadar to order the building of the church of St. Matthew in the village, which will be since 17th century Serbian Orthodox church of St. Nicholas. With them was related Juraj Korlatović, knez of a noble table in the Mogorović tribe in Lika 1499, who in 1505 bought some lands in Tihlić and other, in 1512 was župan of Bužani županija, built castle Korlat(ović) and bought castle Oporovac in 1513. With the latter castle had an ownership dispute with the monastery of St. Margaret in Bijela (near Daruvar). He was prominent in fighting against the Ottoman Empire forces, including assistance to Petar Kružić at the Siege of Klis in 1527, and advocated coronation of John Zápolya. The Korlatović branch permanently settled in the 16th century in Zadar.

They had estates in Karin, Nadin, Eastern Krbava and Pounje. They are for the last time mentioned by name, as self-identification, in the hinterland of Zadar in 1498, and 1510 in Cetina.

=== Notable members ===
- Našman Petrušević (1360–1361)
- Vladiha Petrušević (1379–1416)
- Juraj Korlatović (1499–1536)

== See also ==
- Croatian nobility
- Twelve noble tribes of Croatia
- List of noble families of Croatia
