= Korlat =

Korlat may refer to:

- Korlát, a village near Gönc, Hungary
- Korlat, Croatia, a village near Benkovac

== See also ==
- Korlati
