= Milan Stegnjajić =

Yugoslav footballer

Personal information
- Full name: Milan Stegnjajić
- Date of birth: 19 August 1962 (age 64)
- Place of birth: Benkovac, SR Croatia, SFR Yugoslavia
- Position: Defender

Senior career*
Years	Team	Apps	(Gls)
1981–1984	Velebit		
1984–1986	Zadar	16	(1)
1986–1988	Sloboda Tuzla	29	(2)
1988–1990	Spartak Subotica	36	(4)
1990–1991	Borac Banja Luka	15	(1)
1991–1992	Sloboda Tuzla		
- * Club domestic league appearances and goals

Milan Stegnjajić (born 19 August 1962) is a Yugoslav retired footballer.

== Career ==
Milan Stegnjajić started playing football in his hometown Benkovac for the local club Velebit which played in lower leagues. Good displays as defender earned him transfers to bigger clubs, first to NK Zadar in the Yugoslav Second League in 1984, and then, from 1986 till 1992 he will play in the Yugoslav First League with FK Sloboda Tuzla, FK Spartak Subotica and FK Borac Banja Luka.
