= Zagrad, Benkovac =

Zagrad
- Village
- Location of Zagrad in Croatia
- Country: Croatia
- Region: Adriatic Croatia
- County: Zadar County
- Municipality: Benkovac

Area
  - Total: 10.0 km^{2} (3.9 sq mi)
- Elevation: 114 m (374 ft)

Population (2021)
  - Total: 49
  - Density: 4.9/km^{2} (13/sq mi)
- Time zone: UTC+1 (CET)
  - Summer (DST): UTC+2 (CEST)
- Postal code: 23420
- Area code: (+385) 23

Zagrad is a village in the municipality of Benkovac, Zadar County, Croatia.

== Demographics ==
According to the 2011 census, the village of Zagrad has 85 inhabitants. This represents 19.95% of its pre-war population according to the 1991 census.

The 1991 census recorded that 61.03% of the village population were ethnic Serbs (260/426), 38.03 % were Croats (162/426) while 0.94% were of other ethnic origin (4/426).

Historical population 1857-2011
v

population			93	102	70	176			423	287	332	329	497	426	103	85
	1857	1869	1880	1890	1900	1910	1921	1931	1948	1953	1961	1971	1981	1991	2001	2011

Sources: Croatian Bureau of Statistics publications

NOTE: The 1857, 1869, 1921 and 1931 population data is contained in population data for Nadin

== Notable natives and residents ==
- Danijel Subašić (born 1984) - footballer and goalkeeper for AS Monaco and the Croatia national team
