= Stojsavljević =

Stojsavljević is a surname of Serbian origin. Notable people with the name include:

- Lazar Stojsavljević (born 1998), Serbian footballer
- Mika Stojsavljevic (born 2008), British tennis player
- Raoul Stojsavljevic (1887–1930), Austro-Hungarian flying ace
- Živko Stojsavljević (1900–1978), Serbian painter
