= Lisičić =

Lisičić may refer to:

- Lisičić (surname)
- Lisičić, Croatia, a village near Benkovac
