= Mravince =

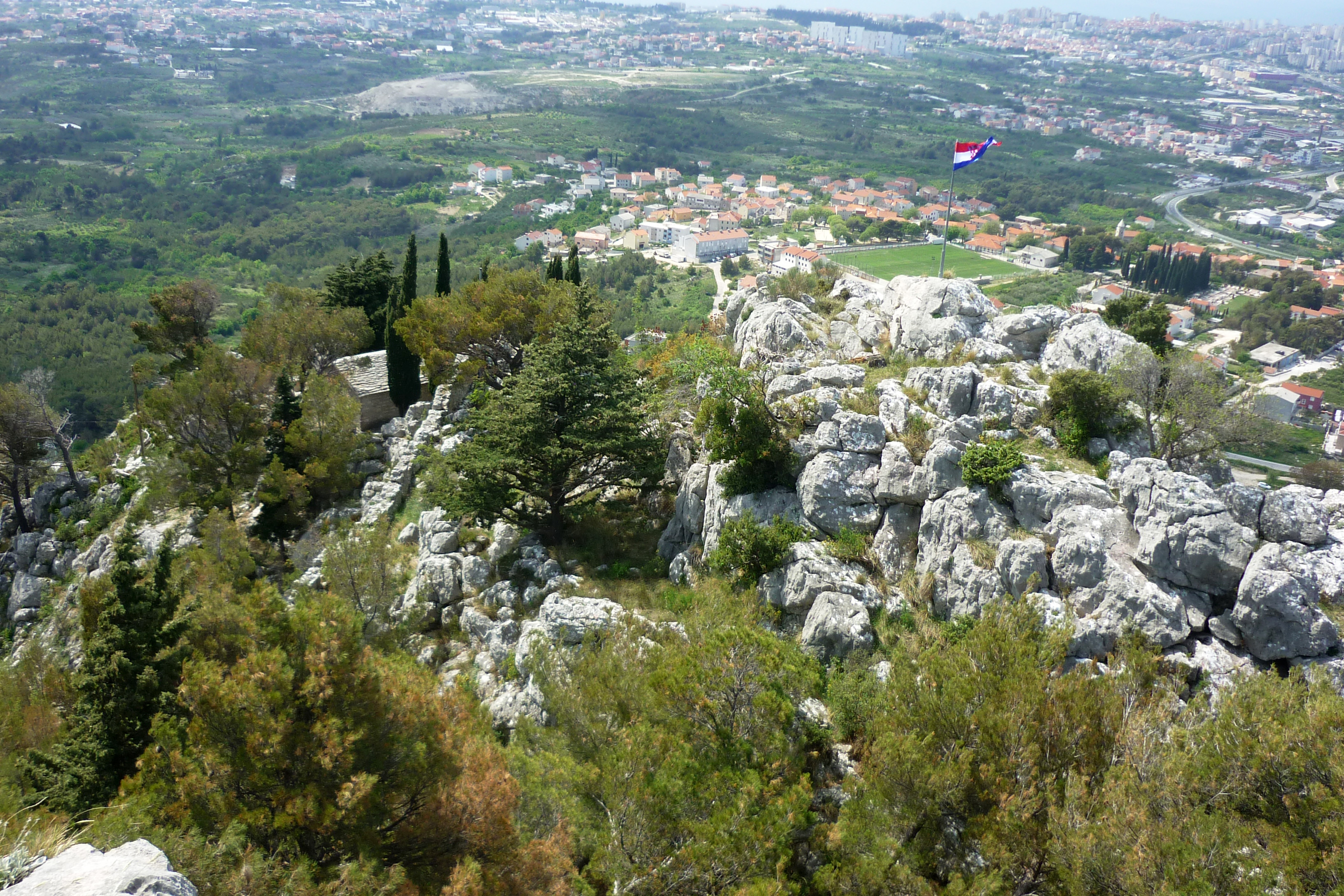
- Interactive map of Mravince
- Location within Croatia
- Coordinates: 43.532887°N 16.515736°E

Area
  - Total: 2.8 km^{2} (1.1 sq mi)

Population (2021)
  - Total: 1,717
  - Density: 610/km^{2} (1,600/sq mi)

Mravince is a village in Dalmatia, Croatia, located east of Solin, Croatia. The population is 1,628 (census 2011).

== History ==
On 7 February 2022, a tornado of intensity IF0.5 hit Mravince, causing minimal damage. This was on the same day as a tornado that hit Miranje.
