= Kula Atlagić =

- Location within Croatia
- Coordinates: 44.0590°N 15.5890°E
- Country: Croatia
- County: Zadar
- City: Benkovac

Area
  - Total: 13.6 km^{2} (5.3 sq mi)

Population (2021)
  - Total: 131
  - Density: 9.63/km^{2} (24.9/sq mi)
- Time zone: UTC+1 (CET)
  - Summer (DST): UTC+2 (CEST)

Kula Atlagić (Serbian Cyrillic: Кула Атлагић), also known as Kula Atlagića, is a settlement in the Benkovac municipality, in the Zadar County in Croatia. It is located in the Ravni Kotari region of Dalmatia.

== Geography ==
Administratively part of the Benkovac municipality in the Zadar County, it is geographically located in the Ravni Kotari region of Dalmatia, in the central part of the country.

== History ==
The settlement initially consisted of two former villages, Tiklić or Tihlić and Bojište. The first was an estate of the old Croatian noble family of Lapčani and Karinjani. It received its current name in the 17th century from the feudal family Atlagić, which during the Ottoman period built a tower house (kula).

During the Croatian War (1991–95) the settlement was part of the Republic of Serbian Krajina.

== Culture ==
There is an old Roman Catholic church dedicated to St. Peter from the 12th century, and two Serbian Orthodox churches dedicated to St. Nicholas, of which the older is Orthodox since the 17th century as it was built in 1446 as Roman Catholic and dedicated to St. Matthew by the nobles from Karinjani family.

== Demographics ==
According to the 2011 census, there were 184 inhabitants. In 2001 that number was 151. In 1991, the settlement had a total population of 913, out of whom Serbs were 855, Croats 43, Yugoslavs 11, and others and unknown 4.
