= Miranje =

- Village
- Location of Miranje in Croatia
- Coordinates: 43°59′55″N 15°35′12″E
- Country: Croatia
- Region: Adriatic Croatia
- County: Zadar County
- Municipality: Benkovac

Area
  - Total: 9.3 km^{2} (3.6 sq mi)
- Elevation: 166 m (545 ft)

Population (2021)
  - Total: 236
  - Density: 25/km^{2} (66/sq mi)
- Time zone: UTC+1 (CET)
  - Summer (DST): UTC+2 (CEST)
- Postal code: 23420
- Area code: (+385) 23

Miranje is a village in the municipality of Benkovac, Zadar County, Croatia.

== History ==
On 7 February 2022, a tornado of intensity IF1 hit Miranje, damaging 36 houses and some cars. This was on the same day as a tornado that hit Mravince.

== Demographics ==
According to the 2011 census, the village of Miranje has 303 inhabitants. This represents 94.98% of its pre-war population according to the 1991 census.

The 1991 census recorded that 98.11% of the village population were ethnic Serbs (313/319), 0.62 % were Croats (2/319) while 1.25% were of other ethnic origin (4/319).

Historical population 1857-2011
v

population	115		105	124	139	176	192	226	261	297	349	358	325	319	86	303
	1857	1869	1880	1890	1900	1910	1921	1931	1948	1953	1961	1971	1981	1991	2001	2011

Sources: Croatian Bureau of Statistics publications

NOTE: The 1869 population data is included in the population data of Gornja Jagodnja, municipality of Polača.
