= Donje Ceranje =

- Village
- Location of Donje Ceranje in Croatia
- Coordinates: 43°57′46″N 15°35′46″E
- Country: Croatia
- County: Zadar County
- Municipality: Benkovac

Area
  - Total: 6.3 km^{2} (2.4 sq mi)
- Elevation: 146 m (479 ft)

Population (2021)
  - Total: 42
  - Density: 6.7/km^{2} (17/sq mi)
- Time zone: UTC+1 (CET)
  - Summer (DST): UTC+2 (CEST)
- Postal code: 23420 Benkovac
- Area code: (+385) 23

Donje Ceranje is a village within the town Benkovac. It is 5 km (3.1 mi) south of Benkovac near the Vrana Lake.

== Demographics ==
According to the 2011 census, the village of Donje Ceranje has 22 inhabitants. This represents 7.46% of its pre-war population according to the 1991 census.

The 1991 census recorded that 92.20% of the village population were ethnic Serbs (272/295), 6.44% were Croats (19/295) while 1.36% were of other ethnic origin (4/295).

Historical population 1857-2011
v

population	319	515	127	121	157	202	427	552	350	395	417	409	388	295	43	22
	1857	1869	1880	1890	1900	1910	1921	1931	1948	1953	1961	1971	1981	1991	2001	2011

Sources: Croatian Bureau of Statistics publications

NOTE: The 1857, 1869, 1921 and 1931 population figures also include the population of the Gornje Ceranje village.

== Notable natives and residents ==
- Milorad Pupovac, a notable Croatian Serb politician was born in Donje Ceranje.
