= Martinac (priest) =

Priest Martinac (Croatian: pop Martinac) was a 15th-century Croatian Glagolite scribe, calligrapher and illuminator. He originated from the Lapčan family.

In 1484–1494 in Grobnik he copied the Drugi novljanski brevijar ("The Second Novi Vinodolski Breviary") for the Pauline monastery in Novi Vinodolski, a Glagolitic codex in 500 folios. Column gaps were filled with his writings. The most famous is the one from 1493 – Zapis popa Martinca ("The Record of Father Martinac") in which he describes the difficult situation in Croatia after the defeat of the Croatian nobility at the Battle of Krbava Field. That record is attested in folios 267 a–d and is written in a mixture of a Croatian vernacular and Church Slavonic. It is inspired by the biblical Book of Judith and describes the atrocities of Ottoman Turks as they as "flocked unto the people of Croatia" (nalegoše na ezikь hrvatski). Martinac's account of the battle is generally recognized as the beginnings of Croatian patriotic poetry.

== Gallery ==
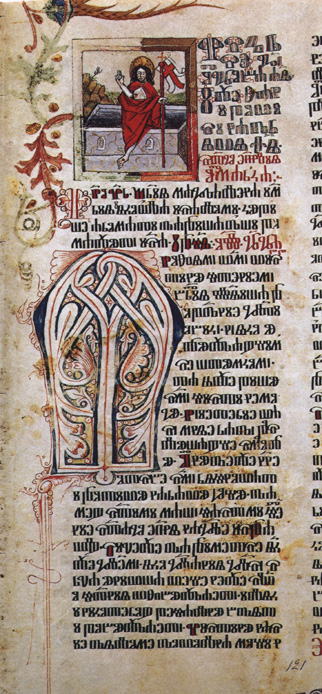
Drugi Novljanski Brevijar, 1484–1494

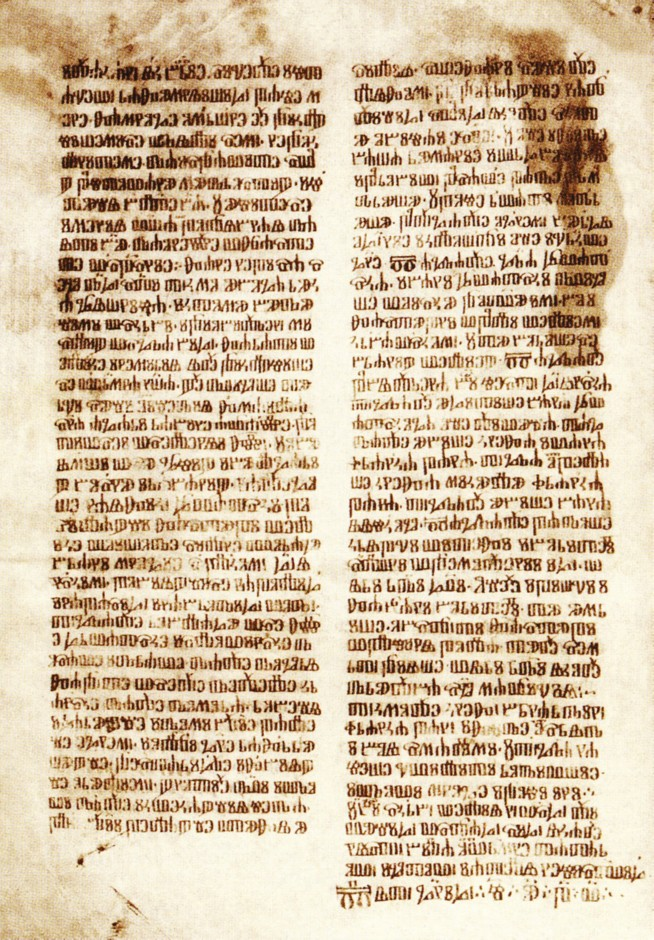
Zapis popa Martinca, 1493
