= Ljubomir Crnokrak =

Serbian professional football manager

Personal information
- Date of birth: 19 March 1958 (age 68)
- Place of birth: Pristeg, PR Croatia, Yugoslavia

Youth career
- Years: Team
- Red Star Belgrade

Managerial career
- GSP Polet
- Palilulac Beograd
- 1991–1992: Sloga Zemun (woman)
- 1992–1995: Crnokrak Academy
- 1995–199x: Sloga Petrovac
- Srem Jakovo
- Šumadija Aranđelovac
- 2005–2007: Dominican Republic
- 2012: Radnik Surdulica

Ljubomir Crnokrak (Serbian Cyrillic: Љубомир Црнокрак; born 19 March 1958) is a Croatian Serb professional football manager. He was also a fashion model and instructor.

== Career ==
Born in Pristeg, a village in the outskirts of Benkovac, back then part of SR Croatia, he started playing football at a very early age. Most of his friends and neighbors were supporters of Red Star Belgrade. Recognising his talent, DIF professor Veljko Aleksić sent Crnokrak to the capital to join Red Star Belgrade for training. There he was taught by authorities in the field such as Ćiro Blažević, Branko Stanković, Dragoslav Šekularac, Vladica Popović, Ratomir Dujković, and Dragan Džajić. This provided him the ability to attend and participate in UEFA seminars.

However, by that time he was dedicating himself to professional modeling, which provided him with a good income. He also taught younger models. During this time he decided to sacrifice his football career for modeling, but he later returned to football.

He returned to football by coaching lower-level clubs such as GSP Polet and Palilulac Beograd and the women's club Sloga Zemun, which he began in 1991. In 1992, he founded his own football academy. In 1995, he returned to his coaching career with Sloga Petrovac, Srem Jakovo and Šumadija Aranđelovac in succession.

Wishing to take on new challenges, in 2004 he moved to the Dominican Republic and from 2005 until 2007 he coached the Dominican Republic national football team. When he started, the team was ranked 193 in FIFA rankings, and by time he left it had risen to 135. He put the team among the top eight CONCACAF teams, but a lack of financial resources stopped the project and Crnokrak left.
