= Buković, Croatia =

Buković
- Village
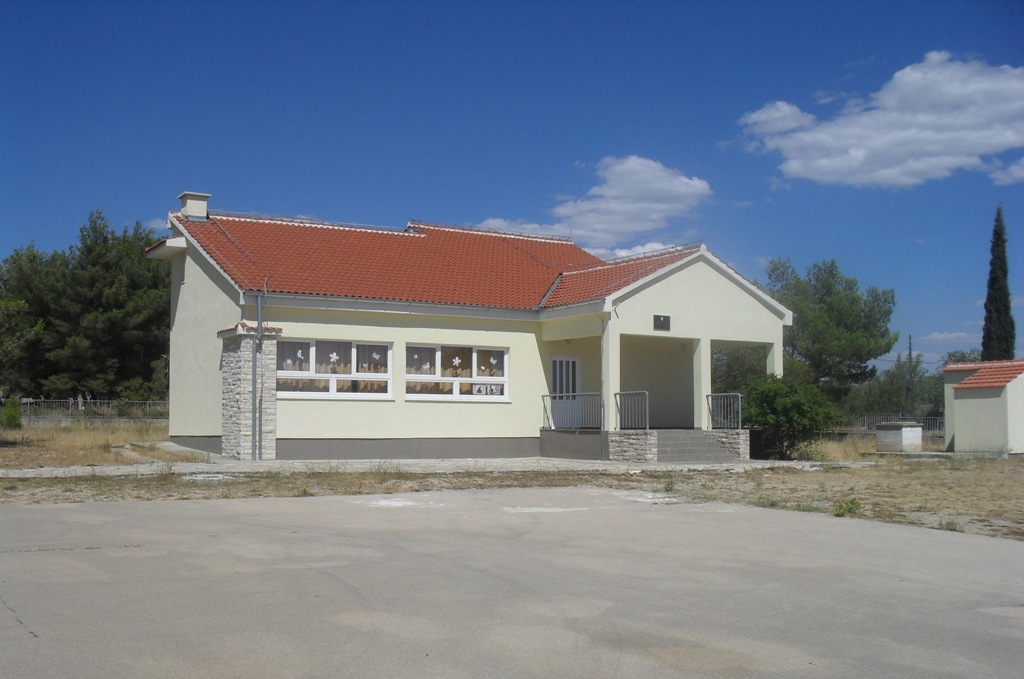
- Elementary school

- Location within Croatia
- Coordinates: 44°01′32″N 15°38′34″E
- Country: Croatia
- County: Zadar County
- Municipality: Benkovac

Area
  - Total: 9.8 km^{2} (3.8 sq mi)
- Elevation: 240 m (790 ft)

Population (2021)
  - Total: 421
  - Density: 43/km^{2} (110/sq mi)
- Time zone: UTC+1 (CET)
  - Summer (DST): UTC+2 (CEST)
- Postal code: 23420
- Area code: 023

Buković is a village within the town Benkovac. It is 1 km (0.62 mi) east of Benkovac.

== History ==
In 2004 Prime Minister of Croatia Ivo Sanader, together with Minister of Foreign Affairs of Bulgaria Solomon Passy and the President of the Serb National Council Milorad Pupovac visited Serb returnees who left the country in 1995 at the time of the Operation Storm.

== Population/Demographics ==
According to 1991 census, there were 904 inhabitants, of which 895 were Serbs and 9 others. According to national census of 2011, population of the settlement is 526.
