= 2014–15 US Sassuolo Calcio season =

Sassuolo
2014–15 season
- President: Carlo Rossi
- Manager: Eusebio Di Francesco
- Stadium: Mapei Stadium – Città del Tricolore
- Serie A: 12th
- Coppa Italia: Round of 16
- Top goalscorer: League: Domenico Berardi (15); All: Domenico Berardi (15)
- Highest home attendance: 21,584 vs Juventus (18 October 2014, Serie A)
- Lowest home attendance: 1,000 vs Cittadella (21 August 2014, Coppa Italia)
- Average home league attendance: 12,831
| Home colours | Away colours | Third colours |

The 2014–15 season was Unione Sportiva Sassuolo Calcio's second consecutive season in Serie A after having been promoted at the end of the 2012–13 season. The club improved markedly on its 2013–14 season, when it finished just above the relation zone in 17th place, by finishing 12th in the 2014–15 campaign, safely in midtable and without the threat of relegation which had dogged the club during its first season in Serie A. The club also competed in the Coppa Italia, where it was eliminated in the Round of 16.

== Players ==
=== Squad information ===
As of 9 March 2015.

Note: Flags indicate national team as defined under FIFA eligibility rules; some limited exceptions apply. Players may hold more than one non-FIFA nationality.

| No. | Pos. | Nation | Player |
|---|---|---|---|
| 1 | GK | ITA | Alberto Pomini (vice-captain) |
| 3 | DF | ITA | Alessandro Longhi |
| 4 | MF | ITA | Francesco Magnanelli (captain) |
| 5 | DF | ITA | Luca Antei |
| 6 | MF | GHA | Raman Chibsah |
| 7 | MF | ITA | Simone Missiroli |
| 8 | MF | ITA | Davide Biondini |
| 10 | FW | ITA | Simone Zaza |
| 11 | DF | CRO | Šime Vrsaljko |
| 14 | FW | GRE | Anastasios Donis |
| 15 | DF | ITA | Francesco Acerbi |
| 16 | GK | ITA | Ciro Polito |
| 17 | FW | ITA | Nicola Sansone |
| 19 | MF | ALG | Saphir Taïder (on loan from Internazionale) |

| No. | Pos. | Nation | Player |
|---|---|---|---|
| 20 | DF | ITA | Paolo Bianco |
| 23 | DF | ITA | Marcello Gazzola |
| 25 | FW | ITA | Domenico Berardi (on loan from Juventus) |
| 26 | DF | ITA | Emanuele Terranova |
| 28 | DF | ITA | Paolo Cannavaro |
| 30 | FW | SVN | Dejan Lazarević (on loan from Chievo) |
| 31 | DF | ITA | Federico Peluso |
| 32 | DF | ITA | Cesare Natali |
| 33 | MF | ITA | Matteo Brighi |
| 47 | GK | ITA | Andrea Consigli |
| 79 | GK | ITA | Gianluca Pegolo |
| 83 | FW | ITA | Antonio Floro Flores |
| 99 | FW | ITA | Sergio Floccari |

== Transfers ==
=== In ===
| — | FW | ITA | Andrea Consigli (from Atlanta) |
| — | FW | CRO | Šime Vrsaljko (from Genoa) |

== Competitions ==
=== Serie A ===
==== League table ====
| Pos | Team | Pld | W | D | L | GF | GA | GD | Pts |
|---|---|---|---|---|---|---|---|---|---|
| 10 | Milan | 38 | 13 | 13 | 12 | 56 | 50 | +6 | 52 |
| 11 | Palermo | 38 | 12 | 13 | 13 | 53 | 55 | −2 | 49 (Note: Palermo finished ahead of Sassuolo on head-to-head away goals scored: Palermo 2-1 Sassuolo, Sassuolo 0-0 Palermo.) |
| 12 | Sassuolo | 38 | 12 | 13 | 13 | 49 | 57 | −8 | 49 |
| 13 | Hellas Verona | 38 | 11 | 13 | 14 | 49 | 65 | −16 | 46 |
| 14 | Chievo | 38 | 10 | 13 | 15 | 28 | 41 | −13 | 43 |

Source: 2014–15 Serie A, 2014-15 Serie A classification.
Rules for classification: 1) points; 2) head-to-head points; 3) head-to-head goal difference; 4) goal difference; 5) number of goals scored; 6) draw. (Head-to-head record is applied for clubs with the same number of points only once all matches between said clubs have been played.).

==== Results summary ====
| Overall | | | | | | | | Home | | | | | | Away | | | | | |
| Pld | W | D | L | GF | GA | GD | Pts | W | D | L | GF | GA | GD | W | D | L | GF | GA | GD |
|---|---|---|---|---|---|---|---|---|---|---|---|---|---|---|---|---|---|---|---|
| 38 | 12 | 13 | 13 | 49 | 57 | −8 | 49 | 7 | 8 | 4 | 25 | 22 | +3 | 5 | 5 | 9 | 24 | 35 | −11 |

Last updated: 31 May 2015.
Source: Competitive matches

==== Results by round ====
| Round | 1 | 2 | 3 | 4 | 5 | 6 | 7 | 8 | 9 | 10 | 11 | 12 | 13 | 14 | 15 | 16 | 17 | 18 | 19 | 20 | 21 | 22 | 23 | 24 | 25 | 26 | 27 | 28 | 29 | 30 | 31 | 32 | 33 | 34 | 35 | 36 | 37 | 38 |
|---|---|---|---|---|---|---|---|---|---|---|---|---|---|---|---|---|---|---|---|---|---|---|---|---|---|---|---|---|---|---|---|---|---|---|---|---|---|---|
| Ground | H | A | H | A | H | A | H | A | H | A | H | A | H | A | A | H | A | H | A | A | H | A | H | A | H | A | H | A | H | A | H | A | H | H | A | H | A | H |
| Result | D | L | D | D | L | L | D | W | W | D | D | W | W | D | L | D | W | D | D | L | W | D | L | L | L | L | W | L | W | L | D | L | L | D | W | W | W | W |
| Position | 10 | 18 | 17 | 18 | 20 | 20 | 19 | 15 | 13 | 14 | 13 | 11 | 10 | 10 | 11 | 12 | 10 | 11 | 11 | 12 | 11 | 12 | 12 | 12 | 12 | 14 | 13 | 14 | 12 | 12 | 12 | 15 | 16 | 16 | 16 | 13 | 12 | 12 |

Updated to match(es) played on 31 May 2015. Source: Competitive matches
A = Away; H = Home; W = Win; D = Draw; L = Loss

==== Matches ====
| 31 August 2014 1 | Sassuolo | 1–1 | Cagliari | Reggio Emilia |
| 20:45 CEST (UTC+02:00) | Berardi (yellow card) 34'; Zaza 42', (yellow card) 90+1'; Peluso (yellow card) 86' | Report | Sau 44'; Balzano (yellow card) 49'; Conti (yellow card) 75' | Stadium: Mapei Stadium – Città del Tricolore; Attendance: 11,292; Referee: Paolo Valeri |

| 14 September 2014 2 | Internazionale | 7–0 | Sassuolo | Milan |
| 15:00 CEST (UTC+02:00) | Icardi 3', 30', 53'; Kovačić 21'; Osvaldo 43', 72'; Guarín 74' | Report | Ariaudo (yellow card) 33'; Berardi (red card) 60' | Stadium: San Siro; Attendance: 34,549; Referee: Gianpaolo Calvarese |

| 21 September 2014 3 | Sassuolo | 0–0 | Sampdoria | Reggio Emilia |
| 15:00 CEST (UTC+02:00) | Magnanelli (yellow card) 9'; Peluso (yellow card) 59'; Antei (yellow card) 76' | Report | Gastaldello (yellow card) 35'; Gabbiadini (yellow card) 60' | Stadium: Mapei Stadium – Città del Tricolore; Attendance: 12,004; Referee: Marco Di Bello |

| 24 September 2014 4 | Fiorentina | 0–0 | Sassuolo | Florence |
| 20:45 CEST (UTC+02:00) | Rodríguez (yellow card) 29'; Bernardeschi (yellow card) 90+2' | Report | Vrsaljko (yellow card) 24'; Floro Flores (yellow card) 29' | Stadium: Stadio Artemio Franchi; Attendance: 28,175; Referee: Angelo Cervellera |

| 28 September 2014 5 | Sassuolo | 0–1 | Napoli | Reggio Emilia |
| 12:30 CEST (UTC+02:00) | Brighi (yellow card) 23'; Taïder (yellow card) 52'; Zaza (yellow card) 55'; Gazzola (yellow card) 75' | Report | Callejón 28'; Gargano (yellow card) 52'; Jorginho (yellow card) 78' | Stadium: Mapei Stadium – Città del Tricolore; Attendance: 13,935; Referee: Sebastiano Peruzzo |

| 5 October 2014 6 | Lazio | 3–2 | Sassuolo | Rome |
| 15:00 CEST (UTC+02:00) | Mauri 9'; Đorđević 25'; Onazi (yellow card) 27'; Candreva 35'; Cana (yellow card) 42' (yellow-red card) 49'; Marchetti (yellow card) 82' | Report | Berardi 26', 50' (pen.); Peluso (yellow card) 28' (yellow-red card) 61'; Cannavaro (yellow card) 67' | Stadium: Stadio Olimpico; Attendance: 29,381; Referee: Dino Tommasi |

| 18 October 2014 7 | Sassuolo | 1–1 | Juventus | Reggio Emilia |
| 20:45 CEST (UTC+02:00) | Zaza 13', (yellow card) 38'; Acerbi (yellow card) 87' | Report | Pogba 19', (yellow card) 50'; Bonucci (yellow card) 90+3' | Stadium: Mapei Stadium – Città del Tricolore; Attendance: 21,584; Referee: Luca Banti |

| 25 October 2014 8 | Parma | 1–3 | Sassuolo | Parma |
| 18:00 CEST (UTC+02:00) | Mendes (yellow card) 23'; De Ceglie (yellow card) 40'; Lucarelli (yellow card) 45'; Cassano 78'; Ristovski (yellow card) 90+3' | Report | Floccari 20'; Acerbi 23', (yellow card) 58'; Consigli (yellow card) 26'; Taïder 52' | Stadium: Stadio Ennio Tardini; Attendance: 11,313; Referee: Paolo Tagliavento |

| 28 October 2014 9 | Sassuolo | 3–1 | Empoli | Reggio Emilia |
| 20:45 CET (UTC+01:00) | Taïder (yellow card) 44'; Missiroli 56'; Floccari 61'; Berardi 73'; Acerbi (yellow card) 89' | Report | Croce 18'; Vecino (yellow card) 19'; Maccarone (yellow card) 28'; Tonelli (yellow card) 75' | Stadium: Mapei Stadium – Città del Tricolore; Attendance: 10,710; Referee: Daniele Orsato |

| 2 November 2014 10 | Chievo | 0–0 | Sassuolo | Verona |
| 15:00 CET (UTC+01:00) | Meggiorini (yellow card) 26' | Report | Acerbi (yellow card) 22'; Magnanelli (yellow card) 36'; Sansone (yellow card) 40'; Vrsaljko (yellow card) 71'; Antei (yellow card) 75'; Floro Flores (yellow card) 90' | Stadium: Stadio Marc'Antonio Bentegodi; Attendance: 5,500; Referee: Marco Guida |

| 8 November 2014 11 | Sassuolo | 0–0 | Atalanta | Reggio Emilia |
| 18:00 CET (UTC+01:00) | Magnanelli (yellow card) 15'; Berardi (yellow card) 30'; Vrsaljko (yellow card) 90+2' | Report | Benalouane (yellow card) 26' | Stadium: Mapei Stadium – Città del Tricolore; Attendance: 10,776; Referee: Fabrizio Pasqua |

| 23 November 2014 12 | Torino | 0–1 | Sassuolo | Turin |
| 12:30 CET (UTC+01:00) | Peres (yellow card) 45+1'; Gazzi (yellow card) 58' | Report | Cannavaro (yellow card) 28'; Zaza (yellow card) 45+1'; Peluso (yellow card) 75'; Floro Flores 87' | Stadium: Stadio Olimpico di Torino; Attendance: 15,528; Referee: Nicola Rizzoli |

| 29 November 2014 13 | Sassuolo | 2–1 | Hellas Verona | Reggio Emilia |
| 18:00 CET (UTC+01:00) | Taïder (yellow card) 32', (goal) 77'; Sansone 50'; Berardi (yellow card) 59'; Floro Flores (yellow card) 73'; Magnanelli (yellow card) 76' | Report | Moras 7'; Hallfreðsson (yellow card) 31'; López (yellow card) 64'; Campanharo (yellow card) 70' | Stadium: Mapei Stadium – Città del Tricolore; Attendance: 12,234; Referee: Daniele Doveri |

| 6 December 2014 14 | Roma | 2–2 | Sassuolo | Rome |
| 18:00 CET (UTC+01:00) | Pjanić (yellow card) 26'; De Rossi (yellow card) 34' (yellow-red card) 51'; Nainggolan (yellow card) 61'; Ljajić 78' (pen.), 90+3' | Report | Zaza 15', 18'; Berardi (yellow card) 64'; Vrsaljko (yellow card) 77' (yellow-red card) 90+4'; Peluso (yellow card) 86' | Stadium: Stadio Olimpico; Attendance: 38,787; Referee: Massimiliano Irrati |

| 13 December 2014 15 | Palermo | 2–1 | Sassuolo | Palermo |
| 18:00 CET (UTC+01:00) | Rigoni 3'; Belotti 90+3', (yellow card) 90+4' | Report | Gazzola (yellow card) 53'; Consigli (red card) 66'; Magnanelli (yellow card) 78'; Pavoletti 85'; Zaza (yellow card) 87'; Cannavaro (red card) 90+6' | Stadium: Stadio Renzo Barbera; Attendance: 21,086; Referee: Fabio Maresca |

| 20 December 2014 16 | Sassuolo | 1–1 | Cesena | Reggio Emilia |
| 18:00 CET (UTC+01:00) | Peluso (yellow card) 53'; Berardi (yellow card) 59'; Zaza 76' (pen.); Missiroli (yellow card) 88'; Magnanelli (yellow card) 90+3' | Report | Defrel (yellow card) 10'; Zé Eduardo 90+4' | Stadium: Mapei Stadium – Città del Tricolore; Attendance: 11,079; Referee: Angelo Cervellera |

| 6 January 2015 17 | Milan | 1–2 | Sassuolo | Milan |
| 15:00 CET (UTC+01:00) | Poli 9', (yellow card) 90+4'; Alex (yellow card) 34'; Ménez (yellow card) 60' | Report | Sansone 28'; Cannavaro (yellow card) 60'; Zaza 67'; Gazzola (yellow card) 74'; Biondini (yellow card) 90+4' | Stadium: San Siro; Attendance: 35,034; Referee: Marco Di Bello |

| 10 January 2015 18 | Sassuolo | 1–1 | Udinese | Reggio Emilia |
| 18:00 CET (UTC+01:00) | Zaza 15'; Berardi (yellow card) 46'; Vrsaljko (yellow card) 49'; Cannavaro (yellow card) 57' | Report | Théréau 26', (yellow card) 58'; Widmer (yellow card) 47' | Stadium: Mapei Stadium – Città del Tricolore; Attendance: 11,221; Referee: Davide Massa |

| 18 January 2015 19 | Genoa | 3–3 | Sassuolo | Genoa |
| 15:00 CET (UTC+01:00) | Iago 25'; Fetfatzidis 53', 90+2' (pen.); Lestienne (yellow card) 75' | Report | Berardi 19' (pen.), 69', (yellow card) 43'; Missiroli 50'; Brighi (yellow card) 55'; Magnanelli (yellow card) 76'; Zaza (yellow card) 81' | Stadium: Stadio Luigi Ferraris; Attendance: 17,822; Referee: Piero Giacomelli |

| 24 January 2015 20 | Cagliari | 2–1 | Sassuolo | Cagliari |
| 18:00 CET (UTC+01:00) | Rossettini 20', (yellow card) 57'; Capuano (yellow card) 31'; João Pedro (yellow card) 57'; Čop 79'; Ekdal (yellow card) 81' | Report | Acerbi (yellow card) 35' (yellow-red card) 88', (goal) 76'; Zaza (yellow card) 60'; Floro Flores (yellow card) 78' | Stadium: Stadio Sant'Elia; Attendance: 14,000; Referee: Gianluca Rocchi |

| 1 February 2015 21 | Sassuolo | 3–1 | Internazionale | Reggio Emilia |
| 12:30 CET (UTC+01:00) | Missiroli (yellow card) 9'; Zaza (yellow card) 11', (goal) 17'; Sansone 29', (yellow card) 84' (yellow-red card) 90'; Berardi (yellow card) 85', (goal) 90+3' (pen.) | Report | Ranocchia (yellow card) 21'; Vidić (yellow card) 66'; Donkor (yellow card) 78' (yellow-red card) 90+2'; Icardi 83', (yellow card) 83'; Medel (yellow card) 90+1' | Stadium: Mapei Stadium – Città del Tricolore; Attendance: 18,446; Referee: Paolo Valeri |

| 8 February 2015 22 | Sampdoria | 1–1 | Sassuolo | Genoa |
| 15:00 CET (UTC+01:00) | Éder 9'; Obiang (yellow card) 12'; Okaka (yellow card) 71'; De Silvestri (yellow card) 84'; Regini (yellow card) 85' | Report | Acerbi 2'; Biondini (yellow card) 13'; Brighi (yellow card) 16'; Lazarević (yellow card) 23'; Cannavaro (yellow card) 58'; Taïder (yellow card) 83' | Stadium: Stadio Luigi Ferraris; Attendance: 19,710; Referee: Massimiliano Irrati |

| 14 February 2015 23 | Sassuolo | 1–3 | Fiorentina | Reggio Emilia |
| 18:00 CET (UTC+01:00) | Longhi (yellow card) 21'; Zaza (yellow card) 48'; Cannavaro (yellow card) 63'; Berardi 67' | Report | Salah 30'; Babacar 32', 62'; Alonso (yellow card) 34'; Savić (yellow card) 54' | Stadium: Mapei Stadium – Città del Tricolore; Attendance: 12,816; Referee: Daniele Doveri |

| 23 February 2015 24 | Napoli | 2–0 | Sassuolo | Naples |
| 19:00 CET (UTC+01:00) | Maggio (yellow card) 34'; Gargano (yellow card) 55'; Zapata 61', (yellow card) 65'; Hamšík 70'; Mertens (red card) 72' | Report | Bianco (yellow card) 38'; Magnanelli (yellow card) 50' | Stadium: Stadio San Paolo; Attendance: 46,925; Referee: Davide Massa |

| 1 March 2015 25 | Sassuolo | 0–3 | Lazio | Reggio Emilia |
| 15:00 CET (UTC+01:00) | Gazzola (yellow card) 22'; Bianco (yellow card) 39'; Longhi (yellow card) 63'; Taïder (yellow card) 76' | Report | Parolo (yellow card) 29', (goal) 77'; Keita (yellow card) 42'; Felipe Anderson 45'; Klose 70' | Stadium: Mapei Stadium – Città del Tricolore; Attendance: 11,807; Referee: Carmine Russo |

| 9 March 2015 26 | Juventus | 1–0 | Sassuolo | Turin |
| 21:00 CET (UTC+01:00) | Tevez (yellow card) 37'; Pogba (yellow card) 78', (goal) 82' | Report | Missiroli (yellow card) 26'; Sansone (yellow card) 68'; Magnanelli (yellow card) 80'; Zaza (yellow card) 90+2' | Stadium: Juventus Stadium; Attendance: 37,506; Referee: Sebastiano Peruzzo |

| 15 March 2015 27 | Sassuolo | 4–1 | Parma | Reggio Emilia |
| 15:00 CET (UTC+01:00) | Acerbi (yellow card) 5'; Sansone 24', 36'; Berardi (yellow card) 38', (goal) 61' (pen.); Missiroli 65' | Report | Gobbi (yellow card) 23'; Lila 26'; Santacroce (yellow card) 28'; Mauri (yellow card) 52'; Mirante (red card) 60'; Galloppa (yellow card) 68' | Stadium: Mapei Stadium – Città del Tricolore; Attendance: 10,525; Referee: Angelo Cervellera |

| 22 March 2015 28 | Empoli | 3–1 | Sassuolo | Empoli |
| 12:30 CET (UTC+01:00) | Saponara 46', 60'; Mchedlidze 59' | Report | Acerbi (yellow card) 44'; Rugani 49' (o.g.); Magnanelli (yellow card) 62' | Stadium: Stadio Carlo Castellani; Attendance: 7,703; Referee: Dino Tommasi |

| 4 April 2015 29 | Sassuolo | 1–0 | Chievo | Reggio Emilia |
| 15:00 CEST (UTC+02:00) | Berardi 23' (pen.); Peluso (yellow card) 38' (yellow-red card) 60'; Biondini (yellow card) 40'; Vrsaljko (yellow card) 48' | Report | Gamberini (yellow card) 22'; Radovanović (yellow card) 67' | Stadium: Mapei Stadium – Città del Tricolore; Attendance: 10,686; Referee: Luca Pairetto |

| 12 April 2015 30 | Atalanta | 2–1 | Sassuolo | Bergamo |
| 15:00 CEST (UTC+02:00) | Biava (yellow card) 21' (yellow-red card) 81'; Denis 42', 63' (pen.); Carmona (yellow card) 55'; Cigarini (yellow card) 67' | Report | Berardi 59', (yellow card) 90+3'; Missiroli (yellow card) 65' (yellow-red card) 71' | Stadium: Stadio Atleti Azzurri d'Italia; Attendance: 15,311; Referee: Daniele Doveri |

| 19 April 2015 31 | Sassuolo | 1–1 | Torino | Reggio Emilia |
| 12:30 CEST (UTC+02:00) | Berardi (yellow card) 31', (goal) 45+1' (pen.); Acerbi (yellow card) 61' | Report | Vives (yellow card) 45+3'; Quagliarella 59' (pen.); Farnerud (yellow card) 75'; Basha (yellow card) 90+2' | Stadium: Mapei Stadium – Città del Tricolore; Attendance: 12,500; Referee: Gianpaolo Calvarese |

| 26 April 2015 32 | Hellas Verona | 3–2 | Sassuolo | Verona |
| 15:00 CEST (UTC+02:00) | Rafael (red card) 17'; Greco (yellow card) 25'; Juanito 30'; Toni 63', 70'; Moras (yellow card) 90'; Obbadi (yellow card) 90+3' | Report | Moras 35' (o.g.); Berardi (yellow card) 76'; Cannavaro (yellow card) 76'; Floro Flores 89' | Stadium: Stadio Marc'Antonio Bentegodi; Attendance: 18,375; Referee: Daniele Chiffi |

| 29 April 2015 33 | Sassuolo | 0–3 | Roma | Reggio Emilia |
| 20:45 CEST (UTC+02:00) | Cannavaro (yellow card) 56'; Zaza (yellow card) 57'; Taïder (yellow card) 69' | Report | Doumbia 6'; Florenzi 27'; Ibarbo (yellow card) 32'; De Rossi (yellow card) 33'; Astori (yellow card) 42'; Pjanić 74' | Stadium: Mapei Stadium – Città del Tricolore; Attendance: 12,196; Referee: Paolo Mazzoleni |

| 2 May 2015 34 | Sassuolo | 0–0 | Palermo | Reggio Emilia |
| 20:45 CEST (UTC+02:00) | Lazarević (yellow card) 54'; Brighi (yellow card) 90+3' | Report | Terzi (yellow card) 28'; Vitiello (yellow card) 35'; Rigoni (yellow card) 52' | Stadium: Mapei Stadium – Città del Tricolore; Attendance: 11,321; Referee: Ivano Pezzuto |

| 10 May 2015 35 | Cesena | 2–3 | Sassuolo | Cesena |
| 15:00 CEST (UTC+02:00) | Defrel 15'; Brienza 29', (yellow card) 62'; Carbonero (yellow card) 90+3' | Report | Zaza 48'; Taïder 51'; Missiroli 69' | Stadium: Stadio Dino Manuzzi; Attendance: 13,712; Referee: Luca Banti |

| 17 May 2015 36 | Sassuolo | 3–2 | Milan | Reggio Emilia |
| 12:30 CEST (UTC+02:00) | Berardi 13', 31', 77'; Missiroli (yellow card) 45+1'; Consigli (yellow card) 72' | Report | Bonaventura (yellow card) 16' (yellow-red card) 57', (goal) 33'; Bonera (yellow card) 39'; Alex 51'; Honda (yellow card) 72'; El Shaarawy (yellow card) 84'; Paletta (yellow card) 86'; Suso (red card) 90+4' | Stadium: Mapei Stadium – Città del Tricolore; Attendance: 13,777; Referee: Marco Guida |

| 24 May 2015 37 | Udinese | 0–1 | Sassuolo | Udine |
| 15:00 CEST (UTC+02:00) | Kone (yellow card) 51'; Guilherme (yellow card) 54' (yellow-red card) 79' | Report | Berardi (yellow card) 45+1'; Magnanelli 70' | Stadium: Stadio Friuli; Attendance: 8,899; Referee: Rosario Abisso |

| 31 May 2015 38 | Sassuolo | 3–1 | Genoa | Reggio Emilia |
| 20:45 CEST (UTC+02:00) | Berardi 3'; Zaza 18', 32'; Magnanelli (yellow card) 65'; Sansone (yellow card) 82'; Floccari (yellow card) 88' | Report | Roncaglia (yellow card) 7'; Bertolacci (yellow card) 27'; Pavoletti 41', (yellow card) 67'; Rincón (yellow card) 64'; Izzo (red card) 72' | Stadium: Mapei Stadium – Città del Tricolore; Attendance: 14,886; Referee: Angelo Cervellera |

=== Coppa Italia ===
| 21 August 2014 Third round | Sassuolo | 4–1 | Cittadella | Reggio Emilia |
| 20:30 CEST (UTC+02:00) | Zaza 12'; Sansone 53', 83'; Floro Flores 90+2' | | Coralli 33' | Stadium: Mapei Stadium – Città del Tricolore; Attendance: 1,000; Referee: Sig. Rocchi di Firenze |

| 2 December 2014 Fourth round | Sassuolo | 1–0 | Pescara | Reggio Emilia |
| 18:00 CET (UTC+01:00) | Antei (yellow card) 53'; Floro Flores 57'; Pavoletti (yellow card) 59' | Report | Selasi (yellow card) 63' | Stadium: Mapei Stadium – Città del Tricolore; Attendance: 1,887; Referee: Renzo Candussio |

| 13 January 2015 Round of 16 | Milan | 2–1 | Sassuolo | Milan |
| 21:00 CET (UTC+01:00) | De Jong (yellow card) 25', (goal) 86'; Pazzini 38'; Zapata (yellow card) 64' | Report | Sansone 64' (pen.); Missiroli (yellow card) 67'; Biondini (yellow card) 76'; Cannavaro (yellow card) 85'; Antei (yellow card) 90+3' | Stadium: San Siro; Attendance: 8,393; Referee: Dino Tommasi |

== Statistics ==
=== Appearances and goals ===
| No. | Pos | Nat | Player | Total | | Serie A | | Coppa Italia | |
| No. | Pos | Nat | Player | Apps | Goals | Apps | Goals | Apps | Goals |
Goalkeepers
| 1 | GK | (Italy) ITA | Alberto Pomini | 6 | 0 | 3+1 | 0 | 2 | 0 |
| 16 | GK | (Italy) ITA | Ciro Polito | 0 | 0 | 0 | 0 | 0 | 0 |
| 47 | GK | (Italy) ITA | Andrea Consigli | 35 | 0 | 35 | 0 | 0 | 0 |
| 79 | GK | (Italy) ITA | Gianluca Pegolo | 0 | 0 | 0 | 0 | 0 | 0 |
Defenders
| 3 | DF | (Italy) ITA | Alessandro Longhi | 20 | 0 | 17+2 | 0 | 1 | 0 |
| 5 | DF | (Italy) ITA | Luca Antei | 10 | 0 | 5+3 | 0 | 2 | 0 |
| 11 | DF | (Croatia) CRO | Šime Vrsaljko | 23 | 0 | 21+2 | 0 | 0 | 0 |
| 15 | DF | (Italy) ITA | Francesco Acerbi | 32 | 3 | 32 | 3 | 0 | 0 |
| 20 | DF | (Italy) ITA | Paolo Bianco | 3 | 0 | 1+2 | 0 | 0 | 0 |
| 21 | DF | (Italy) ITA | Leonardo Fontanesi | 3 | 0 | 3 | 0 | 0 | 0 |
| 23 | DF | (Italy) ITA | Marcello Gazzola | 20 | 0 | 14+4 | 0 | 2 | 0 |
| 26 | DF | (Italy) ITA | Emanuele Terranova | 10 | 0 | 9 | 0 | 1 | 0 |
| 28 | DF | (Italy) ITA | Paolo Cannavaro | 25 | 0 | 25 | 0 | 0 | 0 |
| 31 | DF | (Italy) ITA | Federico Peluso | 29 | 0 | 26+2 | 0 | 1 | 0 |
| 32 | DF | (Italy) ITA | Cesare Natali | 3 | 0 | 0+3 | 0 | 0 | 0 |
Midfielders
| 4 | MF | (Italy) ITA | Francesco Magnanelli | 31 | 1 | 28+1 | 1 | 2 | 0 |
| 6 | MF | (Ghana) GHA | Raman Chibsah | 10 | 0 | 3+5 | 0 | 2 | 0 |
| 7 | MF | (Italy) ITA | Simone Missiroli | 34 | 4 | 30+3 | 4 | 1 | 0 |
| 8 | MF | (Italy) ITA | Davide Biondini | 30 | 0 | 17+11 | 0 | 2 | 0 |
| 19 | MF | (Algeria) ALG | Saphir Taïder | 27 | 3 | 19+8 | 3 | 0 | 0 |
| 33 | MF | (Italy) ITA | Matteo Brighi | 24 | 0 | 14+9 | 0 | 1 | 0 |
Forwards
| 10 | FW | (Italy) ITA | Simone Zaza | 33 | 12 | 29+2 | 11 | 2 | 1 |
| 17 | FW | (Italy) ITA | Nicola Sansone | 36 | 7 | 30+5 | 5 | 1 | 2 |
| 25 | FW | (Italy) ITA | Domenico Berardi | 33 | 15 | 32 | 15 | 1 | 0 |
| 30 | FW | (Slovenia) SVN | Dejan Lazarević | 10 | 0 | 4+6 | 0 | 0 | 0 |
| 83 | FW | (Italy) ITA | Antonio Floro Flores | 31 | 4 | 11+18 | 2 | 2 | 2 |
| 99 | FW | (Italy) ITA | Sergio Floccari | 28 | 2 | 10+17 | 2 | 1 | 0 |
Players transferred out during the season
| 13 | DF | (Italy) ITA | Lorenzo Ariaudo | 3 | 0 | 2 | 0 | 1 | 0 |
| 14 | FW | (Italy) ITA | Leonardo Pavoletti | 11 | 1 | 0+9 | 1 | 2 | 0 |
| 21 | DF | (Italy) ITA | Thomas Manfredini | 0 | 0 | 0 | 0 | 0 | 0 |
| 95 | FW | (Italy) ITA | Ettore Gliozzi | 1 | 0 | 0 | 0 | 1 | 0 |

Last updated: 30 May 2015
Source: BDFutbol

=== Goalscorers ===
| Rank | Pos. | No. | Name | Serie A | Coppa Italia | Total |
|---|---|---|---|---|---|---|
| 1 | FW | 25 | (Italy) Domenico Berardi | 15 | 0 | 15 |
| 2 | FW | 10 | (Italy) Simone Zaza | 11 | 1 | 12 |
| 3 | FW | 17 | (Italy) Nicola Sansone | 5 | 2 | 7 |
| 4 | MF | 7 | (Italy) Simone Missiroli | 4 | 0 | 4 |
| 4 | FW | 83 | (Italy) Antonio Floro Flores | 2 | 2 | 4 |
| 6 | MF | 19 | (Algeria) Saphir Taïder | 3 | 0 | 3 |
| 6 | DF | 15 | (Italy) Francesco Acerbi | 3 | 0 | 3 |
| 8 | FW | 99 | (Italy) Sergio Floccari | 2 | 0 | 2 |
| 9 | MF | 4 | (Italy) Francesco Magnanelli | 1 | 0 | 1 |
| 9 | FW | 14 | (Italy) Leonardo Pavoletti | 1 | 0 | 1 |

Last updated: 30 May 2015
