= Simone Zaza =

Italian footballer (born 1991)

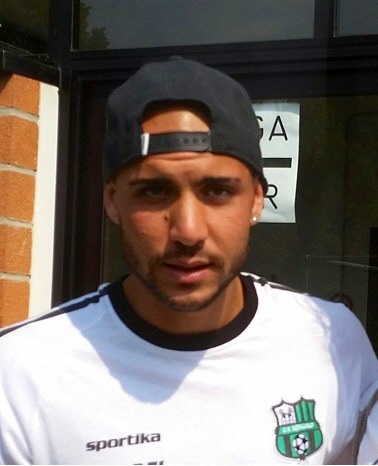
- Zaza with Sassuolo in 2014

Personal information
- Full name: Simone Zaza
- Date of birth: 25 June 1991 (age 35)
- Place of birth: Policoro, Italy
- Height: 1.86 m (6 ft 1 in)
- Position: Striker

Youth career
- 1997–2002: Stella Azzurra Bernalda
- 2002–2006: Valdera
- 2006–2008: Atalanta

Senior career*
Years	Team	Apps	(Gls)
2008–2010	Atalanta	3	(0)
2010–2013	Sampdoria	2	(0)
2011–2012	→ Juve Stabia (loan)	4	(0)
2012	→ Viareggio (loan)	18	(11)
2012–2013	→ Ascoli (loan)	35	(18)
2013	Juventus	0	(0)
2013–2015	Sassuolo	64	(20)
2015–2017	Juventus	19	(5)
2016–2017	→ West Ham United (loan)	8	(0)
2017	→ Valencia (loan)	20	(6)
2017–2019	Valencia	33	(13)
2018–2019	→ Torino (loan)	29	(4)
2019–2022	Torino	62	(12)
Total		297	(89)

International career
2007	Italy U16	3	(0)
2007	Italy U17	2	(0)
2009–2010	Italy U19	1	(0)
2014–2018	Italy	18	(2)
- * Club domestic league appearances and goals

Simone Zaza (born 25 June 1991) is an Italian former professional footballer who played as a striker.

Zaza began his professional club career with Atalanta in 2008, where he remained for two seasons. In 2010, he moved to Sampdoria, where he was sent on loan spells to Juve Stabia, Viareggio and Ascoli. In 2013, he joined Sassuolo, and in 2015, Juventus. In his first season with Juventus, he immediately won a domestic double. After spells abroad at West Ham United and Valencia, Zaza returned to Italy in 2018 and played for Torino until 2022.

At the international level, Zaza made his senior debut for Italy in 2014, and went on to represent his nation at UEFA Euro 2016.

== Club career ==
=== Early career ===
Born in Policoro in the Province of Matera, Zaza grew up in Metaponto and began his youth career with Stella Azzurra from Bernalda in 1997. He remained with the organization until 2002, when he moved to the youth academy of Valdera at the age of 11. He remained until 2006, when he was scouted by Serie A side Atalanta, whom he joined shortly after. He remained within the club's youth team for four years and even began to earn senior call-ups towards the end of the 2008–09 Serie A campaign. He made his Serie A debut on 1 March 2009 in a 0–2 home defeat to Chievo Verona as an 86th-minute substitute for Ferreira Pinto. He made two further substitute appearances for Atalanta that season, though he remained within the club's youth setup for the entire 2009–10 Serie A campaign.

=== Sampdoria ===
In July 2010, Zaza transferred from Atalanta to fellow Serie A side Sampdoria on a four-year contract. With the Genoa-based club, he was enlisted in the club's Primavera (under-20) youth team for the 2010–11 season, though he also earned several first team callups, including two substitute appearances against Genoa and Fiorentina during the 2010–11 Serie A campaign. He was promoted to the first team at the conclusion of that season.

==== Juve Stabia and Viareggio (loans) ====
On 14 July 2011, Zaza was officially sent out on loan to Juve Stabia in Serie B on what was set to be a season-long deal. After just four appearances and no goals for the club, Sampdoria opted to recall the player during the 2012 January transfer window. On 7 January 2012, the club loaned the player to Lega Pro Prima Divisione side, Viareggio on a six-month deal to provide the youngster with regular first team experience. His stint with the third-division club turned out to be very successful; he managed 11 goals in 18 league appearances, 17 as a starter.

==== Ascoli (loan) ====
After returning to Sampdoria on 30 June 2012, Zaza joined Ascoli on another season-long loan deal ahead of the 2012–13 Serie B campaign. He officially joined the club on 16 July and made his debut in a 1–3 home loss to Bari on 1 September. Zaza went on to score 18 league goals in 35 Serie B appearances (30 as a starter) en route to becoming the sixth top goalscorer for the season. His goals were unable to prevent Ascoli's relegation as they finished the season 20th in the league table. He returned to Sampdoria on 30 June 2013.

=== Sassuolo ===
On 9 July 2013, Juventus purchased him outright from Sampdoria for €3.5 million. Simultaneously, he transferred to Sassuolo from Juventus in a co-ownership deal for €2.5 million. He returned to play in Serie A in the first round of the league, with Sassuolo losing to Torino 2–0. On 1 September 2013, during the second round of the league, he scored his first goal in Serie A as the team lost 4–1 to Livorno. Thanks to his effort, Sassuolo secured their first point in the Italian top flight, with the goal scored in the fifth day against Napoli, 1–1.

On 20 June 2014, Sassuolo bought Zaza outright from Juventus for another €7.5 million. Juventus, however, retained the right to re-purchase Zaza for a reported €15 million by 30 June 2015 and €18 million by 30 June 2016.

=== Juventus ===
On 7 July 2015, Juventus announced that they had exercised their option to sign Zaza for €18 million from Sassuolo. It was reported that the return of Domenico Berardi to Sassuolo for a €10 million fee was part of the deal. On 23 September 2015, Zaza opened the scoring in the 50th minute on his debut, a 1–1 draw against Frosinone. On 30 September 2015, he scored the final goal against Sevilla in the UEFA Champions League group stage to secure a 2–0 win; this was his first Champions League goal. He scored the opening two goals of a 4–0 win over cross-city rivals Torino in the Coppa Italia on 16 December.

==== West Ham United (loan) ====
On 28 August 2016, West Ham United announced that they had loaned Zaza for a €5 million loan fee, with a €20 million permanent obligation to buy after a certain number of Premier League appearances, plus €3 million in bonuses. He made his debut with the club on 10 September, in a 4–2 home defeat to Watford in the Premier League. Zaza made 11 appearances for West Ham, eight in the Premier League and three in the EFL Cup, all without scoring. His last game came on 30 November, in a 1–4 away defeat to Manchester United in the EFL Cup. He developed a knee injury in December and was not selected again before leaving the club in January 2017.

=== Valencia ===
On 15 January 2017, Zaza was signed by La Liga club Valencia on loan, for a €2 million fee, with a €16 million permanent obligation to buy fee after a certain number of first team appearances by 30 June 2017, plus €2 million in bonuses. On 21 January, he made his debut with the club in a 2–0 away win against Villarreal. On 19 February, he scored his first goal for the club in a 2–0 home win over Athletic Bilbao. In his next league appearance on 22 February, he scored the opening goal with a notable left footed strike on the turn to help Valencia to a 2–1 home victory over Real Madrid. On 10 April, Zaza was bought outright by Valencia from Juventus until 2021 for the previous agreed fee, effective after 30 June. On 19 September, he scored a hat-trick in under 10 minutes of a 5–0 home win over Málaga.

=== Torino ===
On 17 August 2018, he was loaned to Torino for €2 million, with a €12 million obligation to buy at the end of the season. In the first game of new manager Davide Nicola, he scored two second-half goals to help Torino draw 2–2, having been two goals down at half-time.

On 31 August 2022, Zaza's contract with Torino was terminated by mutual consent.

== International career ==
Zaza has represented Italy in under-16, under-17, and under-19 levels.

On 31 August 2014, he was called up by head coach Antonio Conte as part of the senior team squad for a friendly match against the Netherlands and the first UEFA Euro 2016 qualifying game against Norway. On 4 September, Zaza made his debut with the Italy national team, playing as a starter in a 2–0 win against the Netherlands. He was fouled by Bruno Martins Indi in the ninth minute to win the penalty kick from which Daniele De Rossi scored Italy's second goal in the 2–0 victory. On 9 September, Zaza scored his first goal for the Italy national team in the 16th minute of their opening Euro 2016 qualifier against Norway, of a 2–0 victory. On 31 May 2016, he was named to Conte's 23-man Italy squad for Euro 2016. On 17 June, he came off the bench to set-up Éder's match-winning goal against Sweden in the 88th minute of his nation's second group match, which qualified Italy to the Round of 16. On 2 July, he was brought on in the last few seconds of extra-time to take a penalty in the resulting penalty shoot-out against Germany in the quarter-final match up, which he subsequently missed after a bizarre trot up to the ball, as Italy were defeated in the shoot-out 6–5 and eliminated from the tournament. In the events after the match, Zaza issued an apology to the fans of the national team stating, "I am sorry to have let the Italian people down. I missed the most important penalty of my life and I will carry this burden with me forever ... I have always taken penalties like that and I was convinced I would score, I had sent him [Manuel Neuer] the wrong way but the ball set off and it went like that."

Zaza was called up to the Italy squad for its May and June 2018 friendlies by the newly appointed Roberto Mancini for the first time since Euro 2016. He made an appearance in the last string of friendlies on 4 June against the Netherlands, where he scored the opening goal of a 1–1 draw in Turin.

== Style of play ==
Zaza is a left-footed forward with strong technique, a powerful shot, and an ability to find the net. He is a versatile striker, capable of playing as a centre-forward and as a second striker. His attributes include physical strength, offensive movement, heading accuracy, and positional sense, which contribute to his effectiveness in the air. His goals against prominent clubs while playing for Sassuolo earned him a reputation as an ammazza grandi, or "giant killer."

== Personal life ==
Since 2022, Zaza has been in a relationship with Angelica Erthal, a Brazilian model; their first child was born in January 2024.

== Career statistics ==
=== Club ===
As of match played 18 March 2022

Appearances and goals by club, season and competition
Club	Season	League			National cup (Note: Includes Coppa Italia, FA Cup, Copa del Rey)		League cup (Note: Includes EFL Cup)		Continental		Total	
Club	Season	Division	Apps	Goals	Apps	Goals	Apps	Goals	Apps	Goals	Apps	Goals
Atalanta	2008–09	Serie A	3	0	0	0	—		—		3	0
Atalanta	2009–10	Serie A	0	0	0	0	—		—		0	0
Sampdoria	2010–11	Serie A	2	0	0	0	—		—		2	0
Juve Stabia (loan)	2011–12	Serie B	4	0	0	0	—		—		4	0
Viareggio (loan)	2011–12	Lega Pro	18	11	—		—		—		18	11
Ascoli (loan)	2012–13	Serie B	35	18	1	0	—		—		36	18
Sassuolo	2013–14	Serie A	33	9	2	0	—		—		35	9
Sassuolo	2014–15	Serie A	31	11	3	1	—		—		34	12
Sassuolo	Total		64	20	5	1	–		–		69	21
Juventus	2015–16	Serie A	19	5	3	2	—		2	1	24	8
West Ham United (loan)	2016–17	Premier League	8	0	0	0	3	0	—		11	0
Valencia (loan)	2016–17	La Liga	20	6	—		—		—		20	6
Valencia	2017–18	La Liga	33	13	6	0	—		—		39	13
Torino (loan)	2018–19	Serie A	29	4	1	0	—		—		30	4
Torino	2019–20	Serie A	24	6	1	0	—		6	3	31	9
Torino	2020–21	Serie A	29	6	2	1	—		—		31	7
Torino	2021–22	Serie A	9	0	1	0	—		—		10	0
Torino	Total		91	16	5	1	–		6	3	102	20
Career total			297	89	20	4	3	0	8	4	328	97

=== International ===
As of match played 12 October 2018

National team	Year	Apps	Goals
Italy	2014	4	1
Italy	2015	3	0
Italy	2016	9	0
Italy	2018	2	1
Total		18	2

Scores and results list Italy's goal tally first.

No.	Date	Venue	Opponent	Score	Result	Competition
1.	9 September 2014	Ullevaal Stadion, Oslo, Norway	Norway	1–0	2–0	UEFA Euro 2016 qualification
2.	4 June 2018	Allianz Stadium, Turin, Italy	Netherlands	1–0	1–1	Friendly

== Honours ==
Juventus

- Serie A: 2015–16
- Coppa Italia: 2015–16
- Supercoppa Italiana: 2015

Individual

- La Liga Player of the Month: September 2017
