= Lisičić, Croatia =

Settlement in Zadar County, Croatia

Lisičić
- Settlement
- Interactive map of Lisičić
- Location of Lisičić in Croatia
- Coordinates: 44°01′49″N 15°40′53″E
- Country: Croatia
- County: Zadar County
- City: Benkovac

Area
  - Total: 8.9 km^{2} (3.4 sq mi)

Population (2021)
  - Total: 232
  - Density: 26/km^{2} (68/sq mi)
- Time zone: UTC+1 (CET)
  - Summer (DST): UTC+2 (CEST)
- Postal code: 23420 Benkovac

Lisičić is a settlement in the City of Benkovac in Croatia. In 2021, its population was 232.

== Demographics ==
Lisičić: Population trends 1857–2021
v

population	222	334	292	298	376	424	512	592	512	542	561	528	426	358	268	263	232
	1857	1869	1880	1890	1900	1910	1921	1931	1948	1953	1961	1971	1981	1991	2001	2011	2021

Sources: Croatian Bureau of Statistics publications
