= Živko Stojsavljević =

Serbian painter (1900–1978)

Živko Stojsavljević (1 October 1900, Benkovac, Kingdom of Dalmatia – 19 January 1978, Belgrade) was a Serbian painter.

== Biography ==
He received his first painting lessons in Zadar high school, and afterwards he continued his education in Italy. He lived in Florence and Rome, where he graduated from two prestigious art academies between 1918 and 1924: Royal Institute of Fine Arts in Florence and Higher Royal Institute of Fine Arts in Rome. After returning to his homeland, for a while he lived in Knin; after that, he worked as a professor of fine arts in several towns along the Adriatic coast and in Serbia. In 1931 he settled in Belgrade. He worked as a drawing teacher in many different Belgrade grammar and high schools.

Even as a student, he was interested in decorative wall painting, working alongside his professor, Giulio Bargellini on interiors of public buildings in Rome. He continued painting and decorating interiors of churches throughout his entire career. Nevertheless, Živko Stojsavljević’s s greatest achievements were paintings which depicted lives of peasants and fishermen, coastal landscapes, paintings of Belgrade and its vicinity, as well as places in which he decorated churches, still nature, portraits, and paintings of far away cities. Most of the landscapes were painted in direct contact with nature, under the open sky. In works which depict the view from his studio he achieved the authentic expression – a characteristic combination of still life and landscape. During his career, which spanned over more than five decades, he painted several hundreds of oil paintings and water colors.

He also regularly took part in many group exhibitions: Belgrade Autumn and Spring Exhibitions, ULUS exhibitions and many others. After 1952 he took part in exhibitions organized by the Lada artist association, as well as having eighteen independent exhibitions, first of which was held in 1920 in Florence, and the last in 1974 in Zemun.

== Artistic phases ==
During that period, his work went through several phases:

- The strong influence of the Secession is noticeable during the early, the Dalmatian phase, which lasted until the middle of the 1920s, as well as the phase focused on folklore and historical motifs depicted in nationalist-romantic manner. Near the end of the third decade, the secessionistic decorativeness is replaced by constructivistic influence.
- The Belgrade phase began with his moving to Belgrade in 1931, and lasted until World War II. During that period, Stojsavljević completely developed himself as a painter, painting mostly themes related to the seaside, and embracing the style of Belgrade of intimistic circle and poetic realism. Like many other artists, after the war he accepted the dictate of ideology and themes which depicted the renovation of the country and creation of the new society, but the change of themes is not followed by changes in his artistic expression.
- Dedicated to his own creative patterns, the work of Živko Stojsavljević moved in the direction of thematic and coloristic renovation, through his green and blue period which began at the beginning of the fifth decade and lasted for almost twenty years. The palette of cold colors, dominated by green shades, concrete form and color modelation of this phase represents the poetic continuation of artist’s creative interests during the pre-war period.
- The true innovation occurred in the last, coloristic phase, which completed the Stojsavljević’s work. Spontaneous and highlighted strokes and the palette of bright, warm colors, as well as constant returning to the old themes, were characteristic for the final phase of artist’s work. That is exactly the period in which Pavle Beljanski decided to include three of Stojisavljević’s paintings in his collection, with the intention of pointing out the deep roots and the continuity of coloristic style in the 20th-Century Serbian painting.
