= Petrčane =

- Village
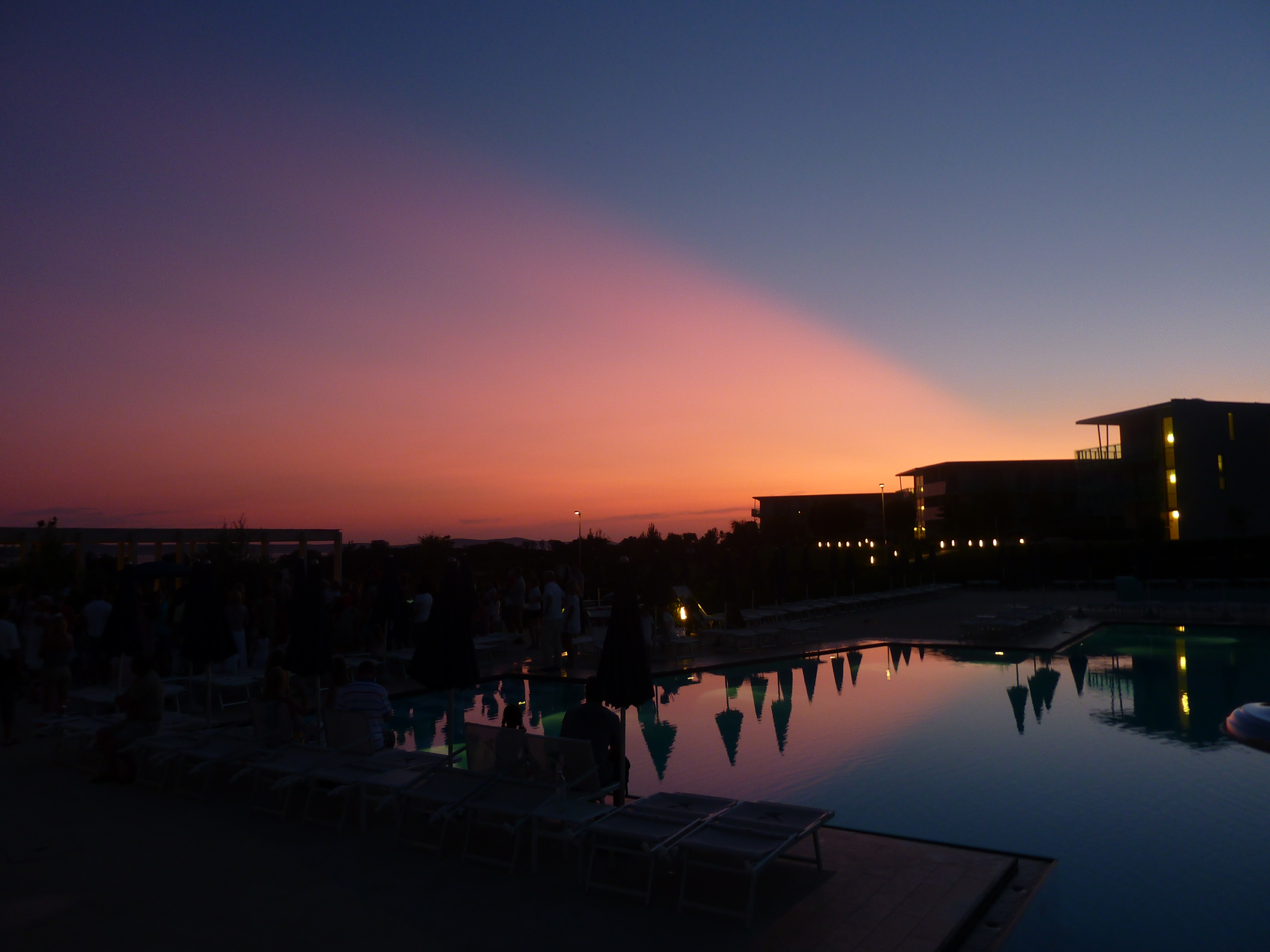
- Dusk from Punta Skala in Petrčane

- Location within Croatia
- Coordinates: 44°11′18″N 15°9′56″E
- Country: Croatia
- Region: Dalmatia
- County: Zadar County

Area
  - Total: 10.6 km^{2} (4.1 sq mi)

Population (2021)
  - Total: 572
  - Density: 54.0/km^{2} (140/sq mi)
- Time zone: UTC+1 (CET)
  - Summer (DST): UTC+2 (CEST)

Petrčane is a resort village located some 12 kilometres north of the town of Zadar, Croatia.

Petrčane, historically sometimes referred to as Petrčani, is a 900-year old village with a population of 601 as of 2011. It has a bay surrounded by two peninsulas – Punta Radman and Punta Skala. Today tourism is the main source of income for the local population who rent apartments, rooms and villas. The historical towns Nin and Zadar are a located to the north and south of the village. It was first mentioned in 1070 and had been traditionally an agricultural and fishing settlement. Its inhabitants speak a distinct Croatian dialect.
