= Korlat, Croatia =

Settlement in Zadar County, Croatia

Korlat
- Settlement
- Interactive map of Korlat
- Location of Korlat in Croatia
- Coordinates: 44°04′58″N 15°33′10″E
- Country: Croatia
- County: Zadar County
- City: Benkovac

Area
  - Total: 18.9 km^{2} (7.3 sq mi)

Population (2021)
  - Total: 279
  - Density: 14.8/km^{2} (38.2/sq mi)
- Time zone: UTC+1 (CET)
  - Summer (DST): UTC+2 (CEST)
- Postal code: 23420 Benkovac

Korlat is a settlement in the City of Benkovac in Croatia. In 2021, its population was 279.

== Demographics ==
Korlat: Population trends 1857–2021
v

population	371	432	473	463	500	576	580	683	931	1019	1118	1142	1070	941	373	353	279
	1857	1869	1880	1890	1900	1910	1921	1931	1948	1953	1961	1971	1981	1991	2001	2011	2021

Sources: Croatian Bureau of Statistics publications
