= Podlug =

- Village
- Location within Bosnia and Herzegovina
- Coordinates: 44.786887°N 16.648075°E
- Country: Bosnia and Herzegovina
- Entity: Federation of Bosnia and Herzegovina
- Canton: Una-Sana
- Municipality: Sanski Most

Area
  - Total: 1.24 sq mi (3.22 km^{2})

Population (2013)
  - Total: 550
  - Density: 440/sq mi (170/km^{2})
- Time zone: UTC+1 (CET)
  - Summer (DST): UTC+2 (CEST)

Podlug is a village in the municipality of Sanski Most, Federation of Bosnia and Herzegovina, Bosnia and Herzegovina.

== Demographics ==
According to the 2013 census, its population was 550.

Ethnicity in 2013
Ethnicity	Number	Percentage
Bosniaks	375	68.2%
Serbs	168	30.5%
Croats	5	0.9%
other/undeclared	2	0.4%
Total	550	100%
