= Benkovac =

- Town
- Grad Benkovac; Town of Benkovac
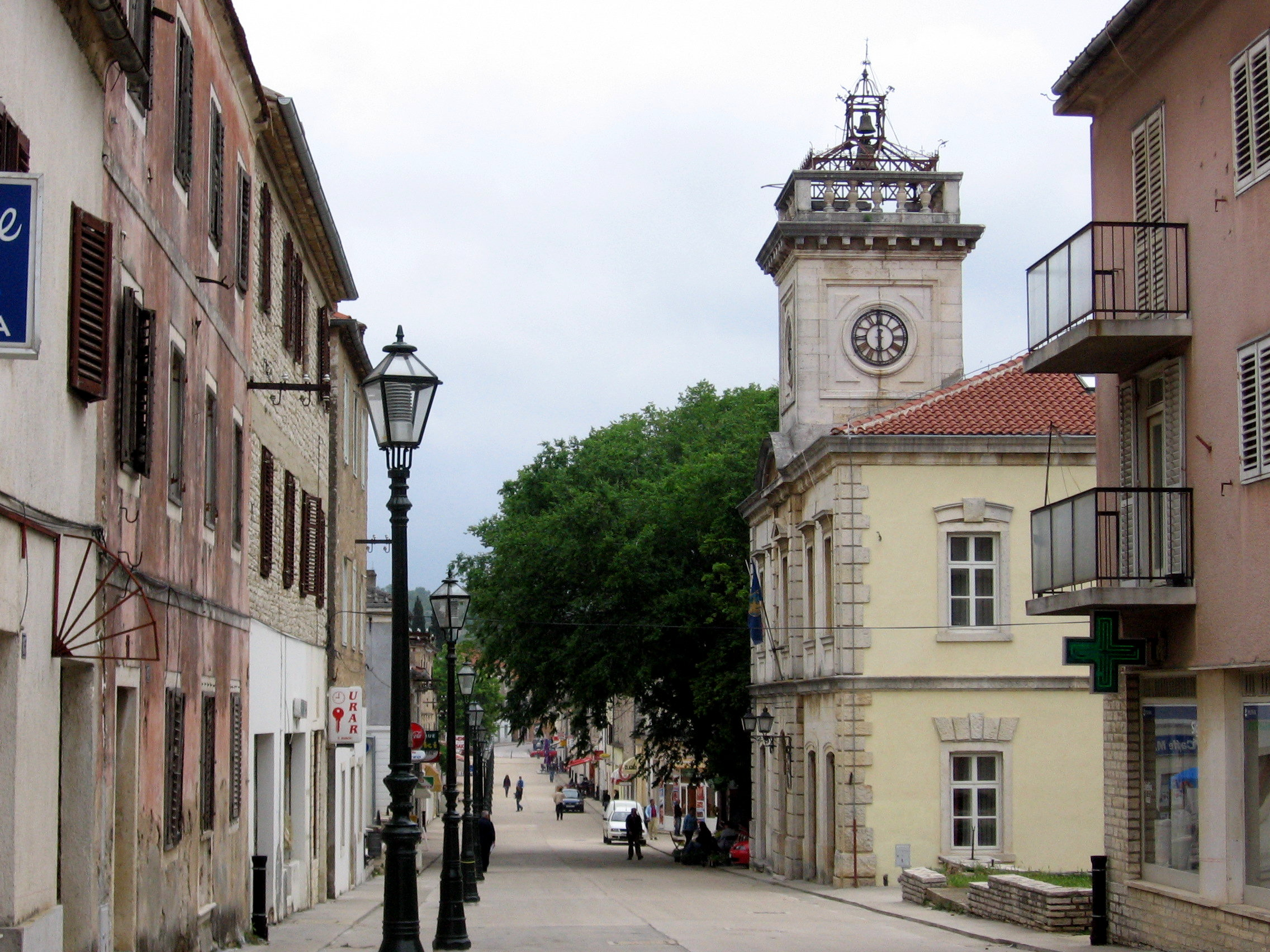
- Street in Benkovac
- Interactive map of Benkovac
- Location within Croatia
- Coordinates: 44°02′04″N 15°36′46″E
- Country: Croatia
- Region: Dalmatia (Ravni Kotari)
- County: Zadar County

Government
  - Mayor: Tomislav Bulić (HDZ)

Area
  - Town: 514.5 km^{2} (198.6 sq mi)
  - Urban: 3.8 km^{2} (1.5 sq mi)

Population (2021)
  - Town: 9,680
  - Density: 18.8/km^{2} (48.7/sq mi)
  - Urban: 2,484
  - Urban density: 650/km^{2} (1,700/sq mi)
- Time zone: UTC+1 (CET)
  - Summer (DST): UTC+2 (CEST)
- Website: benkovac.hr

Benkovac (pronounced [běːnkovat͡s]) is a town and municipality in the Zadar County, Croatia.

== Geography ==
Benkovac is located where the plain of Ravni Kotari and the karstic plateau of Bukovica meet, 20 km from the town of Biograd na Moru and 30 km from Zadar. The Zagreb-Split motorway and Zadar-Knin railway pass through the town. It borders the municipalities of Novigrad, Posedarje, Obrovac, Lišane Ostrovičke, Kistanje and Stankovci.

== Climate ==
Since records began in 1981, the highest temperature recorded at the local weather station was 41.0 °C (105.8 °F), on 5 August 2017. The coldest temperature was −9.5 °C (14.9 °F), on 27 February 2018.

== Demography ==
According to the 2021 census, the municipality had 9,728 inhabitants of which 84.45% were ethnically Croatian and 13.8% were ethnically Serbian with 0.54% declaring as other ethnicities. Before the Croatian War of Independence, Serbs made up about 57%, and Croats about 41%, however Croats only held 18% of the jobs in the local government, which led to high tensions. In 1991, Croats were forced to leave their homes (either as refugees or displaced persons) due to intimidation and physical threats from Serbian paramilitary units, both domestic and from Serbia and Bosnia and Herzegovina. During Operation Storm (Oluja), almost all of the Serbs fled or were forced from the town, and after the war they were replaced by Bosnian Croat settlers.

Town of Benkovac: Population trends 1857–2021
v

population	10054	10816	11226	11712	13478	16253	18018	18850	23700	25755	28227	27810	26532	26255	9786	11026	9680
	1857	1869	1880	1890	1900	1910	1921	1931	1948	1953	1961	1971	1981	1991	2001	2011	2021

Sources: Croatian Bureau of Statistics publications

According to the Austrian Census in 1900, the town of Benkovac consisted of 356 Catholics and 156 Orthodox, with area surrounding Benkovac it included 8,119 Catholics and 5,981 Orthodox. The 1910 census recorded a total of 810 residents, 388 of which were Catholic and 422 Orthodox. Both censuses were conducted according to religion and language (Serbo-Croatian). The population of Benkovac itself is 2,622 (census 2001), the rest is distributed in 38 villages surrounding it.

== Politics ==
=== Minority councils and representatives ===
Directly elected minority councils and representatives are tasked with consulting tasks for the local or regional authorities in which they are advocating for minority rights and interests, integration into public life and participation in the management of local affairs. At the 2023 Croatian national minorities councils and representatives elections Serbs of Croatia fulfilled legal requirements to elect 15 members minority councils of the Town of Benkovac.

== History ==
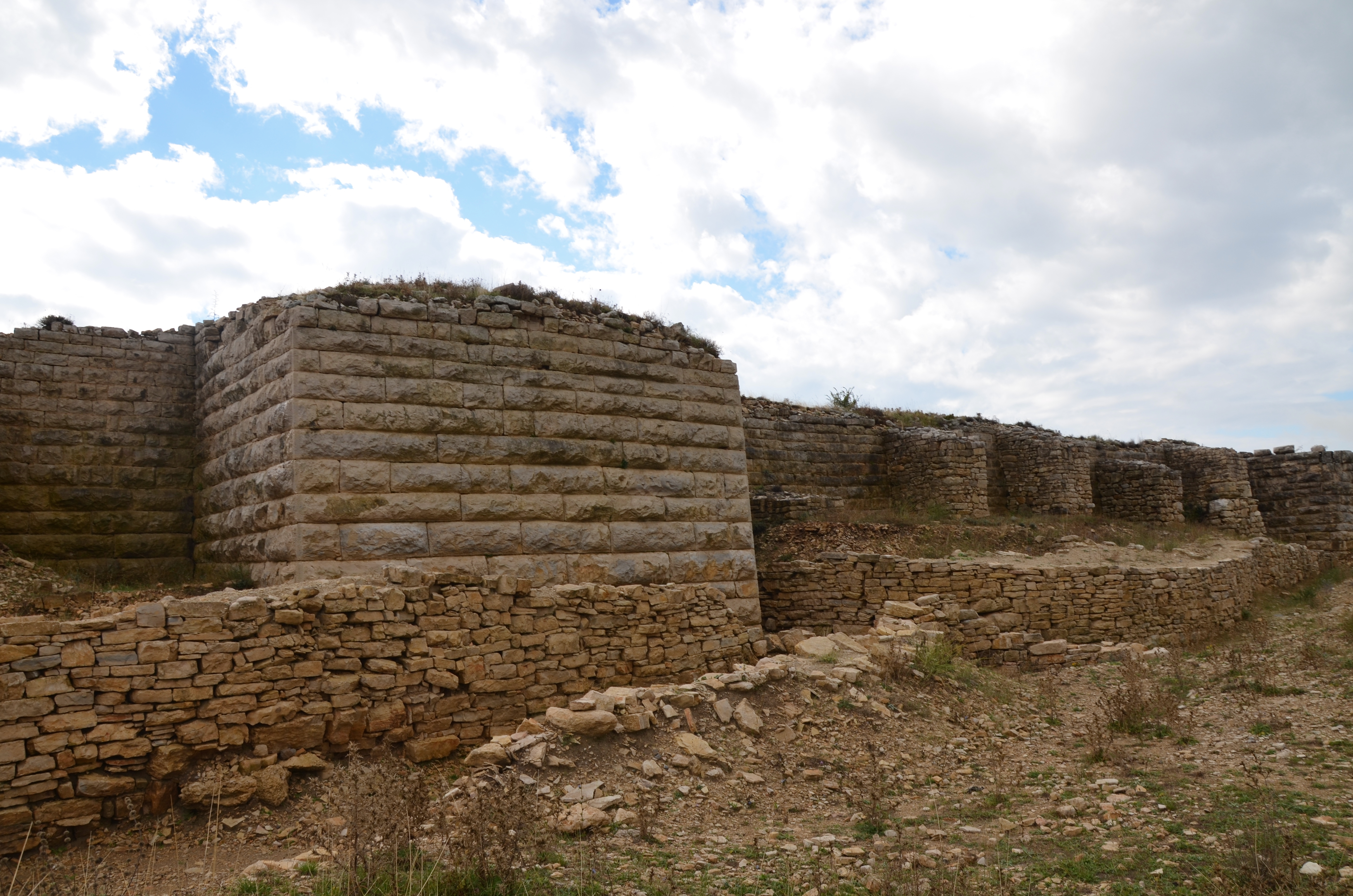
The remains of Liburnian settlement Asseria, 6km east of Benkovac

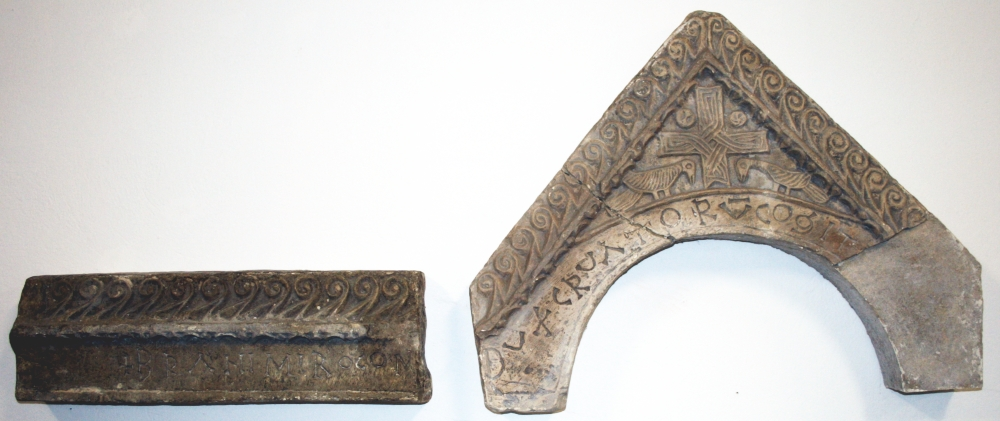
The Branimir inscription, part of templon of a church in Šopot

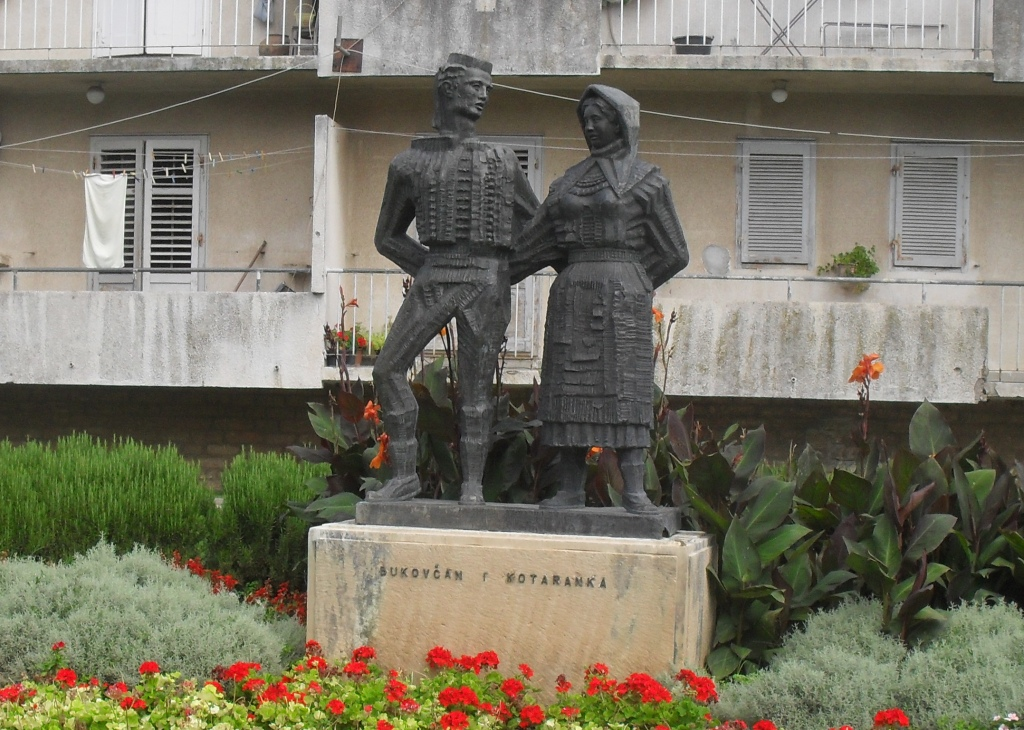
Monument Bukovčan i Kotaranka

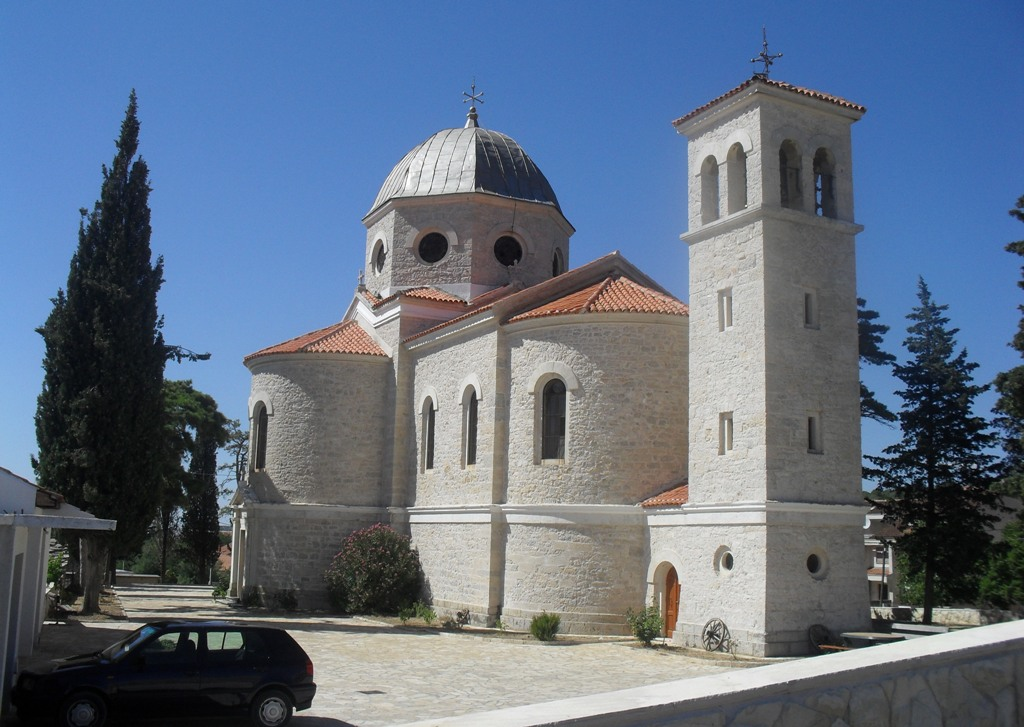
Serbian Orthodox church

The first traces of human life in the Benkovac area were found around the village of Smilčić that belonged to the Danilo culture. Before Roman conquest the area was inhabited by the Illyrian tribe of Liburnians. During the Roman Civil war the Liburnians sided with Caesar. The Romans mention the following Liburnian settlements: Nedinum (Nadin), Carinium (Karin), Varvaria (Bribir) and Asseria (Podgrađe). In the 7th century the area was settled by Croats. The area of Benkovac was at the crossroads of four Croatian župas - Novljanska, Sidraška, Bribirska and Karinska. Near the village of Šopot, an inscription from the 9th century was found that mentions Branimir as a Croatian Duke.

In 1409 King Ladislaus of Naples sold his rights of Dalmatia to the Republic of Venice and the Benkovac area became a border region. New fortresses around the border were built - Korlat, Kličevica, Polača, and behind them Benković i Perušić. The fortress of Benković was named after the Croatian noble family that built it and the city of Benkovac was established. Today it has been restored and houses a modern museum. In 1527 Benkovac became part of the Ottoman Empire. It was settled by Croats-Bunjevci, Serbs and Vlachs.

In October 1683, the population of Venetian Dalmatia, principally Uskoks of Ravni Kotari, took arms and together with the rayah (lower class) of the Ottoman frontier regions rose up, taking Skradin, Karin, Vrana, Benkovac and Obrovac. It became part of the Republic of Venice following the Morean War.

After the Treaty of Campo Formio in 1797 and Treaty of Poznań in 1805, Benkovac came under French administration. In 1813, when it came under Austrian administration, Benkovac had 5,200 inhabitants.

Until 1918, the town (with bilingual name BENKOVAC - BENCOVAZ) was part of the Habsburg monarchy in the district of the same name, one of 13 Bezirkshauptmannschaften in Dalmatia. The name was BENCOVACZ before 1867.

From 1929 to 1939, Benkovac was part of the Littoral Banovina and from 1939 to 1941 of the Banovina of Croatia within the Kingdom of Yugoslavia.

During World War II Benkovac was under administration of Fascist Italy. The local population was driven to the collection center in Benkovac, and then by boat to Molat concentracion camp. The area was also bombed by the Allies.

In 1990, during a HDZ campaign rally in Benkovac, stones, eggs and bottles were constantly thrown at the speakers, and occasionally gunshots were heard. A Serbian man pulled out a gas pistol near the podium. Croatian media described the incident as an assassination attempt on Franjo Tuđman. The incident further worsened ethnic tensions. On 17 March 1990, tensions erupted when groups of local Serbs rebelled against the decision of the Croatian government to disarm local police in which Serbs were most of the employees. During that time the provincial Croatian government continued arming police forces and paramilitaries in villages with ethnic Croat majorities.

In August 1990, the Serbs began what became known as the Log Revolution, where barricades of logs were placed across roads throughout the South as an expression of their secession from Croatia. Tensions continued to boil, and five months later, Benkovac was included in the quasi-state Republic of Serbian Krajina. The Yugoslav People's Army took an active role in events in Benkovac on 19 May, distributing a leaflet with the names of 41 Croats targeted for immediate execution and providing weapons to SAO Krajina forces in the area. By the end of May 1991, entire families of Croats fled to Zadar. Croats that stayed after occupation in Benkovac and the surrounding area swere killed by Serb rebels. On 5 August 1995, Benkovac was liberated by the Croatian Army during Operation Storm.

In 2004 Prime Minister of Croatia Ivo Sanader, together with Minister of Foreign Affairs of Bulgaria Solomon Passy and the President of the Serb National Council Milorad Pupovac visited Serb returnees who left the country in 1995 at the time of the Operation Storm in Donje Biljane and Buković as well as new Croat settlers in the village of Benkovačko Selo.

In 2013, criminal charges were filed against eight persons who were responsible for the deaths of 231 persons in the period from July 1991 to March 1993, in the area of the former municipalities of Benkovac and Obrovac.

== Towns and villages ==
The following settlements are part of Benkovac:

- Benkovac (population 2,866)
- Benkovačko Selo (population 789)
- Bjelina (population 92)
- Brgud (population 13)
- Bruška (population 113)
- Buković (population 526)
- Bulić (population 147)
- Dobra Voda (population 113)
- Donje Biljane (population 102)
- Donje Ceranje (population 22)
- Donji Karin (population 174)
- Donji Kašić (population 63)
- Donji Lepuri (population 174)
- Gornje Biljane (population 170)
- Gornje Ceranje (population 62)
- Islam Grčki (population 150)
- Kolarina (population 39)
- Korlat (population 353)
- Kožlovac (population 20)
- Kula Atlagić (population 184)
- Lisičić (population 263)
- Lišane Tinjske (population 97)
- Medviđa (population 140)
- Miranje (population 303)
- Nadin (population 406)
- Perušić Benkovački (population 153)
- Perušić Donji (population 123)
- Podgrađe (population 87)
- Podlug (population 177)
- Popovići (population 210)
- Pristeg (population 316)
- Prović (population 93)
- Radošinovci (population 238)
- Raštević (population 468)
- Rodaljice (population 67)
- Smilčić (population 248)
- Šopot (population 281)
- Tinj (population 530)
- Vukšić (population 513)
- Zagrad (population 85)
- Zapužane (population 56)

== Benkovac fair ==
One of the most famous attractions in Benkovac is the monthly fair, taking part on every 10th of the month. Originally dealing in livestock, it has grown to become the biggest fair in Dalmatia, offering a wide range of products (e.g. livestock, tools, car parts, antiques, clothes, various foodstuffs, CDs, used books etc.), often touted as having "everything from a needle to a locomotive". Visitors often sample the local food, most notably the roast lamb.

== Culture ==
- City library
- Ethnography Museum (Zavičajni muzej Benkovac), founded in 1983, with museological, archaeological, ethnological, cultural-historical, Croatian War of Independence and stone monuments collections
- KUD Branimir Benkovac, folklore society

=== Festivals ===
- Benkovac Summer of Culture (Benkovačko kulturno ljeto)
- VinFest Benkovac, wine festival of Northern and Middle Dalmatia
- Etno festival, folklore festival, held in Ethnography Museum
- Festival of young singers "Benkovac fest"

== Tourism ==
Due to development of tourism by the end of the 2010s, city was named "Dalmatian Provence".

== Media ==
- Radio Benkovac, 93.0 MHz, started broadcasting 11 December 2006.

== Notable people ==
- Šime Đodan
- Milorad Pupovac
- Predrag Vranicki
- Đorđe Čotra
- Ljubomir Crnokrak
- Saša Dobrić
- Đorđe Gagić
- Živko Stojsavljević
- Savo Štrbac
