= Nadin, Croatia =

Nadin
- Location of Nadin in Croatia
- Coordinates: 44.074052°N 15.4982°E
- Country: Croatia
- County: Zadar County

Area
  - Total: 12.8 km^{2} (4.9 sq mi)

Population (2021)
  - Total: 371
  - Density: 29.0/km^{2} (75.1/sq mi)

Nadin is a Croatian village in the Zadar County, located between Benkovac and Škabrnja. The population is 406 (census 2011).

The village was inhabited since the time of the Liburnians when it was named Nedainium. It was conquered by Ottoman Empire in 1527 and was part of Sanjak of Krka till 1683 except brief occupation of Republic of Venice in 1647. It was also ruled by Venice between 1683 and 1797. Nadin was included in Republic of Serbian Krajina between 1991 and 1995. The Nadin massacre was a Serbian war crime carried out by the JNA on November 19, 1991. Five Croatian soldiers and 14 civilians were killed, while three civilians are still missing.
