= Šimun Radojčić =

16th-century Croatian Uskok leader

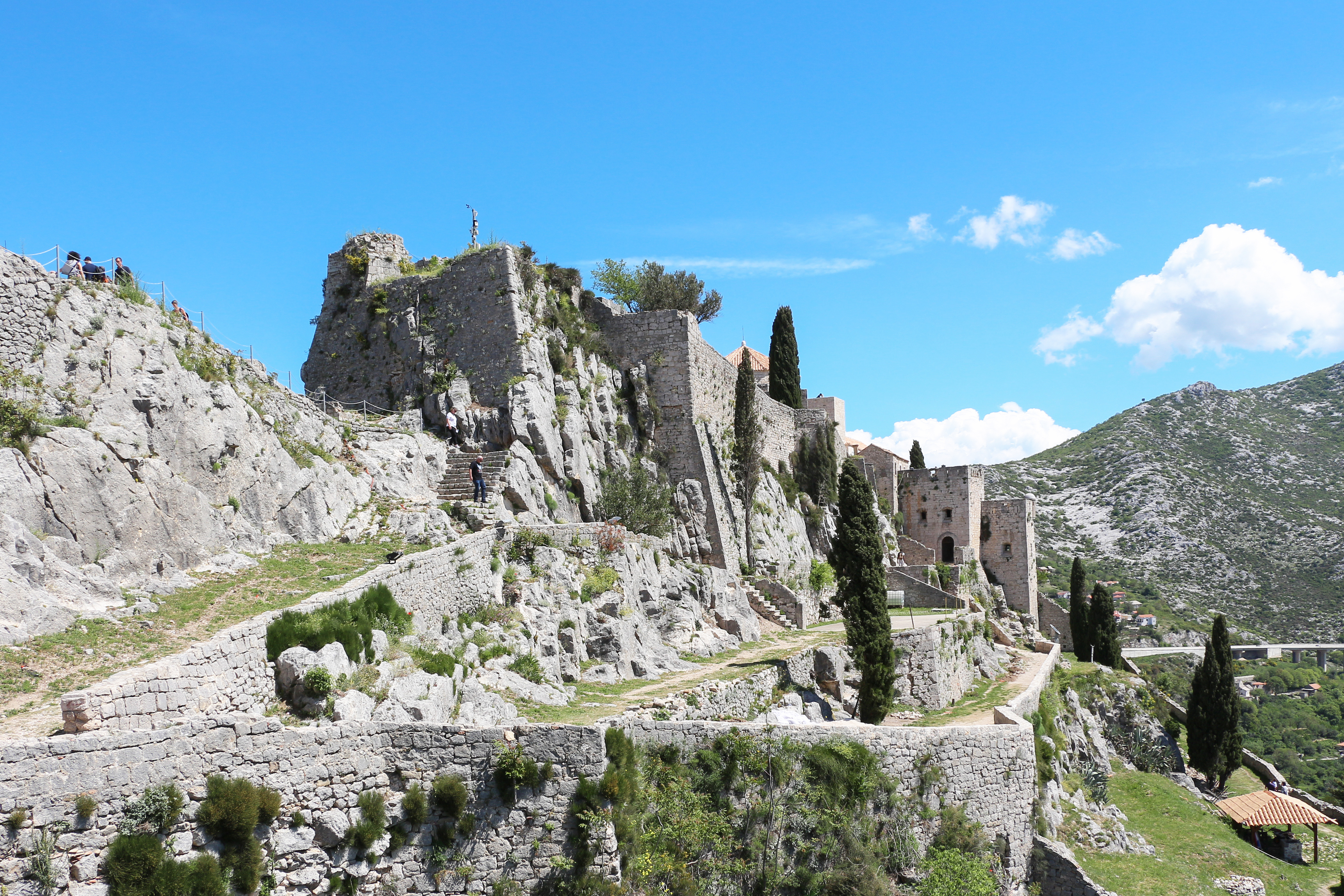
Southern view of Klis Fortress

Šimun Radojčić, better known by the sobriquet Delišimun (Šimun the brave), was a 16th-century Croatian Uskok leader and castellan of Klis Fortress. His descendants adopted the hereditary surname Delišimunović (son of Šimun the brave).

Šimun Radojčić served as the castellan of Klis Fortress during the years 1530 - 1537, a period of constant Ottoman attacks in Dalmatia.

After the fall of Klis, Šimun's family relocated to the Military Frontier, moving to Pokuplje, where they owned Radojčić Castle near Duga Resa. They later relocated to the Žumberak mountains. During his reign (1527 - 1564), Holy Roman Emperor Ferdinand I granted four parcels of land, in Zumberak, to Radojčić. In 1602, Ferdinand II renewed the grant for Radojčić's successor, Mihajlo Delišimunović. The grant was reaffirmed, in Graz, on August 16th, 1624. Radojčić's son, Petar Delišimunović served as captain of Gvozdansko and castellan of Blagaj on the Korana, while later descendants included Franjo Delišimunović, János Delišimunović, Krsto Delišimunović, and Franjo Krsto Delišimunović.

== Identification with Simon ==
In his book Petar Kružić kapetan i knez grada Klisa (Petar Kružić, captain and prince of the city of Klis), the Croatian historian Marko Pejorovic identifies Šimun Radojčić with the priest of Klis during the 1530s whose latinized name was Simon. He proposes this on the basis of two documents which align with Šimun Radojčić’s life.

The first, from the Croatian-Slavonian-Dalmatian national archive organized by Dr. Ivan Bojnic, is dated to 24 February 1528 and reads,

Croatian original:

U Ostrogonu. Strigonii, in vigilia festi beati Mathie apostoli. Mt. reg. quandam partem terre Stagnycza nuncupate per defectum seminis Simoni presbitero de Clisio donavit.

English Translation:

In Ostrog (Esztergom), on the eve of the feast of the blessed Matthias the Apostle. Mt. reg. (an abbreviation referring to royal authority) gave a certain part of the land called Stagnycza, due to the lack of seed (The previous owner had no heirs), to Simon, the priest of Klis.

The second is from the 56th diary of Marino Sanuto the Younger dated to 29 June 1532.

Italian Original:

Di Traù, di sier Alvise Calbo conte et capitanio, di 20, ricevute a dì 29 ditto.

Come sa el magnifico conte di Spalalo scrisse il successo de Clissa, bora avisa esser venuto qui Alvise Vendramin naturai ben noto a la Signoria nostra venuto . hozi da Glissa, et mi ha dito che poi che domino Nicolò Querini nonlio dil reverendo Grill ha auto le chiavi de la forleza el di seguente fece far comandamento al conte Zimbrech et a pre' Simone che prima erano vice conti de li ma reduli nel borgo, che in termine dì 3 hore fusseno partili di quel territorio sotto pena di la vita.

Il prete andò subilo vìa, et li turchi, erano nel castello di Salona, inlesa la partita dil ditto il andorono drio per amazario, el qual fugite, el azonseno a V homo che lo acompagnava el io feriteno, el il prete dito fu salvo in la torre di Ochovicb sopra el leritorio de Spalato.

English Translation:

Of Traù (Trogir), from Sir Alvise Calbo, Count and Captain, dated the 20th, received on the 29th of the same month.

As the Magnificent Count of Split wrote about the events of Klis, It is now reported that Alvise Vendramin, a subject well known to our Signoria, arrived here today from Klis and told me that after Messer Nicolò Querini, son of the late Reverend Grill, had obtained the keys of the fortress, on the following day he issued orders to Count Zimbrech and to Priest Simon, who were previously vice-counts of the morlachs in the village, that within 3 hours they should depart from that territory under penalty of death.

The priest departed at once, and the Turks, who were in the castle of Salona, having heard of the said departure, went after him to kill him. They caught up to him and wounded a man who accompanied him, the said priest found refuge in the tower of Ochovich above the territory of Split.

== See also ==
- List of Croatian soldiers
- List of Croatian noble families
- Delišimunović
