= List of Croatian noble families =

List of noble families of Croatia includes the old, original, ethnically Croatian noble families; families whose titles were granted by the kings of the medieval Kingdom of Croatia and its successors; foreign noble families which were granted Croatian citizenship; and Croatian families which were granted titles by foreign states. It refers to the noble families (including royal or other ruling dynasties) of the historical territories of Croatia, Dalmatia, Slavonia, Istria, and the Republic of Dubrovnik.

== A ==
Name of the family	Timespan	Titles	Notes	Coat of arms
Adamović	17th century–present	Baron		
Ajtić			Also called Jajtić or Jajetić.	
Alapić	?–1584	Baron; Ban	Last member Gašpar Alapić was Ban of Croatia between 1574 and 1578.	
Alberti	13th–20th century	Count (since 1907)	Old noble family from Split	
Althann	1129–present	Count (since 1610)	Noble family of Bavarian origin. Owned the Međimurje County between 1719 and 1791.	
Andechs	12–13th century	Count; Ban; Voivode	Noble family in Istria. Called Andeški in Croatian.	
Andreis			Also called Andrijević or Andrejčić.	
Auersperg			Noble family of German origin.	
Augustić	14th century- present			

== B ==
Name of the family	Timespan	Titles	Notes	Coat of arms
Babonić	13th–14th century	Duke; Ban	Bans of Slavonia in the 13th and 14th centuries. Cadet branch became the Blagajski.	
Baćan	1398–present	Baron (since 1628); Count (since 1630); Duke (since 1764); Ban	Noble family of Hungarian origin (Batthyány) with one branch in Croatia from the 15th century. Bans of Croatia in the 16th, 17th and 18th centuries. Called Baćan in Croatian.	
Bajamonti			Noble family of Lombard origin who have been living in Split since the 18th century.	
Banfi	1226–present	Baron; Count; Ban	Noble family of Hungarian origin (Bánffy) - Lendava branch. Owned parts of Međimurje and Varaždin County Bans of Croatia in the 14th and 15th centuries. Called also Banić in Croatian.	
Barbo			Noble family of Italian origin. Had estates in Motovun and Koper.	
Bebek			Noble family of Hungarian origin. Emeric Bebek was Ban of Croatia and Dalmatia in 1380. Called Bubek in Croatian.	
Bedeković, earlier also known as Komorski.	1267–present	Baron; Ban	Bedeković family, earlier also known as Komorski, named after their estate Komor in Croatian Zagorie county. Today's municipium Bedekovčina (in Krapina-Zagorje county) was named after this family. Koloman Bedeković (1818–1889), a member of the family, was Ban of Croatia between 1871 and 1872.	
Belavić			Noble family originally from the Bihać area.	
Belošević	1635–present		Noble family with estates in former Varaždin and Zagreb County	
Benković	15th century–present			
Benja			Noble family from Zadar.	
Berčić			Noble family of Jewish origin from Stari Grad on the island of Hvar.	
Berislavić of Graberje		Ban Despot		
Berislavić of Trogir	c. 1250–17th century	Ban	Petar Berislavić (1475–1520), a member of the family, was Ban of Croatia between 1513 and 1520.	
Berislavić of Vrh Rike				
Berke			Noble family of Hungarian origin from Prekmurje with estates in Croatia	
Bessen			Noble family of Hungarian origin. Called Bešenići in Croatian.	
Bilić			Notable member was Radojica Bilić from Jajce at the end of the 14th century. In the 16th century, they lived in Bihać, and from 1588, in Šibenik.	
Blagaj	14th–16th century	Counts	Noble family originating as a cadet branch of the Babonići. After the 16th century moved to Slovenia where they survived until the 19th century.	
Bojničić			Noble family originating from Plavno, near Knin.	
Bombelles		Count; Marquess	Noble family of French origin. Owned estates in Croatia (Opeka Manor) in the 19th and 20th centuries.	
Bonda	1190–20th century	Count (since 1857)	Old noble family from the Republic of Dubrovnik. Called Bondić in Croatian.	
Borelli	17th century–present		Noble family of Norman origin. Lived in Zadar.	
Borković			Branch of the Domagović family	
Boršić	16th century		Noble family from the Bihać area	
Bozić	13th century–present	Duke; Ban		
Both	12th–20th century	Baron; Count; Ban	Noble family of Hungarian origin. Owned estates in Croatia (Bajnski Dvori Castle). Bans of Croatia in the 15th and 16th centuries.	
Brdovečki			Called Brdovečki in Croatian and Bardóczy in Hungarian.	
Brlečići	16th century		Noble family from the Bihać area	
Brlekovići			Noble family from Križevci	
Broz	19th century		Noble family from the Zagreb County.	
Budački	1484–1707	Duke	Medieval noble family originally from Lika (Buče), later the Kordun.	
Budisavljevići			Noble family of Serbian origin.	
Budor	15th–18th century			
Bukovački	1579–?		Branch of the Mogorović family	
Bunić	1023–present	Marquess (since 1754)	Oldest noble family from the Republic of Dubrovnik	
Burić	1587	Baron; Knight		
Butković	1650–present	Duke	Medieval noble family originally from Lika (Krbava), but the title and coat of arms were awarded in Slavonia (Syrmia County) in 1650 by Ferdinand III. The village Butkovići in Istria is named after the family.	

== C ==
Name of the family	Timespan	Titles	Notes	Coat of arms
Caballini			Noble family of Italian origin	
Calogerà	(in Dalmatia) 17th century-present	Cittadini Originarii; Baron; Nobili Corcyrensi; Nobili Cretensii; Nobili Costantinopolii; Grand Boyar; Archon	Archontal, noble (Cyprus, Crete, Corfu, Dalmatia), originarii (Venice), and priestly (Roman Catholic, Eastern Orthodox) family of Byzantine-Cypriot origin in Zadar, Hvar, Korčula, and Split. Called Kalogjera, Kalođera, or калогјера in Croatian and Serbian. Island of Ošljak takes its Italian name, Calugerà, after this family.	
Cambi	15th century–present		Noble family of Italian origin from Split	
Candia	10th century–present	Count, Baron	Noble family of Italian Venetian origin from Split, also recorded as Kandija, linked to the Sponheim family and Rauscher of Austria, part of the Old Savoyard and Austro-Croatian nobility owners of estates in Dalmatia and Savoy.	
Cedulin			Noble family from Zadar	
Cega	13th century–present		Noble family of Italian origin from Trogir. Also called Celio.	
Crijević	7th century–present	Count (from 1817)	Old noble family from the Republic of Dubrovnik. Called Crijević in Croatian	
Cindro	13th century–present		Noble family from Split	
Ćipiko			Noble family from Trogir	
Crljen	18th century			
Crnković	1429–present	Count (from 1833)	Noble family with roots from the region of Gorski kotar	
Cvetković			Noble family of Serbian origin	
Cvetnić	1 August 1519–?			
Cvjetković	1756–?		Noble family with roots from the town of Bjelovar	
Česnegić	1263–present	Baron; Count	Noble family of Hungarian origin (Cseszneky). Owned estates in Croatia. Called Česnegić in Croatian.	
Čikulin	16th century–1746	Baron (since 1628); Count (since 1706)	Noble family of Italian origin. Owned estates in Croatia (Lužnica, Medvedgrad, Susedgrad and Donja Stubica). Called Čikulini in Croatian.	

== Č ==
Name of the family	Timespan	Titles	Notes	Coat of arms
Čavrak	29 March 1602 – 11 January 1896		Noble family from Letovanić	
Čipčić	13th–16 century		Noble family from Cetingrad	
Čolić			Noble family from Senj	
Čudomirić	13th–16 century			
Čulić			Descendant from the Lapčan family	
Čupor		Ban	Noble family from Moslavina	

== D ==
Name of the family	Timespan	Titles	Notes	Coat of arms
Damjanović		Count	Noble family from the island of Vrgada. Originated in Poljice, near Omiš and possibly a descendant of the old Tugomirić family.	
Daubachy			Noble family of unknown origin from Zagreb	
Daus	16th century–present	Count	Noble family of Austrian and Venetian origin in Istria	
Draganić	14th–16th century			
Delišimunović	16th century–present	Baron (since 9 August 1675); Count (since 1708)	Branch of the Radojčić noble family, originating from Klis. Franjo Krsto Delišimunović (died in 1696) was Captain of Karlovac	
Deutsch			Noble family of German origin from Macelj	
Devčić	14th century–present	Count	Noble family of Bosnian and Dalmatian origin in Podgora	
Dobrojević	1412−1819		Noble family from Šibenik	
Doimi de Lupis	12th century-present	Ritter (since 1865)	Noble family of Italian origin	
Doklečić	1 August 1519–?			
Domagojević	9th century	Duke	Ruling dynasty of the medieval Duchy of Croatia between 864 and 892.	
Domagović	1327–?		Parent family of the Borković family	
Dominis			Noble family of Italian origin	
Domjanić			Noble family from the island of Rab	
Dončić			Noble family from Zagreb	
Doringer			Noble family of Austrian origin	
Đurđevič	10th-19th century	Count, Marquess, Bishop, Archbishop, Doge, Governor,	Italo-Croatian family with ties to Moravia and Silesia, which was enumerated by the Almanach de Gotha as being among the 11 oldest bloodlines of Dalmatia. Also known as the Giorgi or Zorzi family.	
Draganić	14th–16th century			
Dragojlović			Noble family of Serbian origin	
Drašković	15th century–present	Baron (since 1567); Count (since 1631); Ban	Noble family originating from northern Dalmatia and Lika region; Bans of Croatia in the 16th, 17th and 18th centuries	
Drugec	1 August 1519–?			
Dudić	16th century		Andreas Dudith (1533–1589), a member of the family, was a humanist, astronomer, noblemab and diplomat in Croatia, Hungary and Poland	

== Đ ==
Name of the family	Timespan	Titles	Notes	Coat of arms
Đureković	1 August 1519–?			

== E ==
Name of the family	Timespan	Titles	Notes	Coat of arms
Eltz	1157–present	Baron; Count; Prince-elector	Noble family of German origin. Owned estates in eastern Slavonia and Srijem (including Vukovar) between 1736 and 1945.	
Engel	29 March 1886–?			
Erdödy	1187–present	Count (since 1485); Duke (since 1566); Ban	Noble family of Hungarian origin. They were most notable in Croatia. Bans of Croatia in the 16th, 17th, 18th and 19th centuries.	
Ernušt	15th century–1540	Ban	Noble family of Jewish origin. Came from Sweden to Hungary and Croatia. Owned the Međimurje County between 1473 and 1540 and some other estates in northern Croatia. Bans of Croatia. Called Ernuszt in Hungarian, Ernušt in Croatian.	

== F ==
Name of the family	Timespan	Titles	Notes	Coat of arms
Femen			Noble family of unknown origin	
Fenrich	17th century–present	Junker	Noble family of Prussian origin whose branch was present in Slavonia since the beginning of 20th century. They shortly co-owned Sušine-Gjurgjenovac estate and were one of the founders of the present-day town Đurđenovac.	
Feštetić	15th century–present	Count (since 1766); Prince (since 1911)	Noble family from Turopolje, central Croatia. Most notable in Hungary (Festetics). Owned the Međimurje County between 1791 and 1923. Owned the Novi Dvori near Zaprešić and Bajnski Dvori estates.	
Filipašić			Noble family from Zagreb	
Filipović	16th century–present	Baron (since 1781)	Josip Filipović (1818–1889), the most famous member of the family, was a Croatian high-ranking general (Feldzeugmeister) in the Habsburg Imperial Army	
Flaischman			Noble family of German origin	
Franceschi	1022–present	Count	Old noble family of Italian origin, originally from the Republic of Venice. The family protected Croatia from the Ottoman Empire and owned large estates and palaces along the Dalmatian coast.	
Franić	15th century–present		Noble family from Makarska and its hinterland (southern Croatia)	
Frangipani Frankopan	1116–1671	Duke; Ban	Old noble family known as from the island of Krk. Bans of Croatia in the 14th, 15th, 16th and 17th centuries. Last member was Marquess Fran Krsto Frankopan, who was beheaded for treason against the Habsburgs in 1671.	
Frodnacher	1380–?		Noble family from Upper Austria. Lived in Bednja.	

== G ==
Name of the family	Timespan	Titles	Notes	Coat of arms
Galeković	1507–present		Noble family from Mraclin	
Galović	1 August 1519–?			
Galjuf	1613–?			
Gorjanski	13th century–1481	Ban	Noble family of Hungarian origin (Garai), owned estates in eastern Slavonia (Gorjani etc.). Bans of Croatia in the 14th century. Called Gorjanski in Croatian.	
Getaldić	8th century–20th century		Old noble family from the Republic of Dubrovnik. Called Getaldić in Croatian and Ghetaldi in Italian.	
Gising	12th century–1527	Count; Ban	Noble family of German origin. Owned the Međimurje County in the 13th and 14th centuries. Bans of Croatia in the 13th and 14th centuries. Called Kőszegi in Hungarian.	
Golubić			Noble family from Križevci	
Gotal		Baron	Noble family from Gotalovec	
Gradić	12th century–20th century	Count (since 1817)	Old noble family from the Republic of Dubrovnik	
Graziani	16th century–17th century	Duke	Noble family of Italian origin from Dalmatia. Gaspar Graziani (c.1575–1620), a member of the family, was Voivode of Moldavia between 1619 and 1620.	
Grdenić	1 August 1519–?		Noble family from Križevci	
Gregorijanec	15th century–17th century	Baron	Noble family from the Križevci area. Owners of Medvedgrad Castle.	
Grisogono			Noble family of possible Italian or even Greek ancestry from Split	
Gučetić	8th century–present	Count (since 1687)	Old noble family from the Republic of Dubrovnik	
Gundulić	c. 930–1800	Count (since 1615)	Old noble family from the Republic of Dubrovnik	
Gusić	1102–present	Baron; Ban	Old noble family originating from the Lika region. Members of the Kurjaković family branch were Bans of Croatia in the 15th and 16th century	
Guštak	13th century–present		Old noble family from Hrastje and Sveti Ivan Zelina, Hrvatsko prigorje region. The whole villages were given freedom and nobility by King Béla IV of Hungary as of gratitude, so called plum barons.	
Gutkeled	12th–15th century	Ban	Noble family of German origin	
Gutmann	19th century–20th century	Baron	Noble family of Jewish origin. Founders of the settlement which became Belišće, Croatia	

== H ==
Name of the family	Timespan	Titles	Notes	Coat of arms
Hajnović	3 September 1661–?			
Hellenbach	16th century–present	Baron (since 1651)	Cadet branch of the Czech noble family, originating from Upper Hungary. Owners of Hellenbach Manor near Marija Bistrica (northern Croatia)	
Herberstein			Noble family of Austrian origin	
Horg	1 August 1519–?			
Horžić	1 August 1519–?			
Horvat	14th century–present		Brothers Ivaniš, Pavao and Ladislav Horvat (together with their uncle Ivan Paližna) were opponents of Queen Mary of Hungary (1382–1385) and palatine Nicholas I Garai.	
Hotković	1445–19th century	Baron (since 1791)	Noble family originating from western Croatia. Had estates in Bakar, Modruš and Ozalj. Daniel Peharnik-Hotković was general in Habsburg Imperial Army.	
Humski	16th century–c. 1680			
Huzjak	16th century–present			

== I ==
Name of the family	Timespan	Titles	Notes	Coat of arms
Iločki	13th century–1524	Voivode; Ban	Noble family from the Hrvatska Dubica district in medieval Slavonia. Lords of Ilok since 1364. Nikola Iločki was Ban of "Whole Slavonia" between 1457 and 1463 and anti-king of Bosnia between 1471 and 1477.	
Inkey	16th century–present	Baron (since 1856)	Noble family of Hungarian origin, from Međimurje. Settled in Berzence district (present-day Hungary). Owned estates in Međimurje County and in Rasinja.	
Ivanek	18 June 1647–			
Iveljić	13th century–present	Count	Noble family from Split	
Ivšić	15th century–present		Noble family with estates Slavonia, Syrmia and Pécs	

== J ==
Name of the family	Timespan	Titles	Notes	Coat of arms
Jagić	1569–present			
Jakopčići	13th century–present		Noble family from Ivanić	
Jakopović	1 August 1519–?			
Jakša	14th century–?		Noble family from the island of Hvar	
Jakšić	14th century–?		Noble family from the islands of Hvar and Brač. Possibly related to the Jakša family.	
Jakuš	1 August 1519–?			
Jamomet				
Janković	16th century–present	Baron	Noble family from Daruvar	
Jelačić	14th century–present	Baron (since 1797); Count (since 1854); Ban	Noble house originating from central Bosnia, of Croatian origin. Josip Jelačić (1801–1859), a member of the family, was Ban of Croatia between 1848 and 1859, and Governor of Dalmatia.	
Jelići	14th century–?		Noble family from Bosnia. Settled in Split, Hvar and Brač due to Ottoman invasions.	
Jurčević	16th century–present	Baron (1535–1567); Count (1631–1655)	Noble family originating from northern Dalmatia	
Jurišić	15th century–1572		Noble family from Senj, southern Croatia. Nikola Jurišić (c.1490–1545) was its member, famous for the Siege of Güns.	

== K ==
Name of the family	Timespan	Titles	Notes	Coat of arms
Kabužić (Kaboga)	8th century–present	Count (since 1833)	Old noble family from the Republic of Dubrovnik	
Kačić	11th century–present	Comes	Old noble family from Dalmatia	
Karlović	14th century–present	Baron; Count; Ban	Noble family who were Bans on Croatia, including Ivan Karlović	
Katalenić	16th century–present			
Kaniški	14th century–1571	Ban	Noble family of Hungarian origin. Stjepan, Ladislav and Juraj Kaniški were Bans of Croatia in the 14th, 15th and 16th centuries. Called Kaniški in Croatian and Kanizsai in Hungarian.	
Keglević	14th century–present	Baron; Count; Ban	Noble family from the area of the Zrmanja river in Dalmatia. Had estates in the Bihać area and Bužim.	
Kitonić	16th century–present			
Klokočani	9 January 1224 – 1590		Noble family from Klokoč.	
Knežević	15th –20th century	Baron (since 1763)	Noble family originating from medieval Zachlumia (later called Herzegovina). Since 1466 settled in the Lika region and since 1802 in Međimurje. Members of the family were high-ranking generals in the Habsburg Imperial Army.	
Kolonić	13th century–1874	Baron (since 1583); Count (since 1637)	Noble family originating from the former Pset County in central medieval Croatia (present-day Bosanski Petrovac district in Bosnia and Herzegovina). Most notable in Hungary and Austria.	
Konjski	12th–17th century	Baron (since 1603); Count (since 1649)	Noble family originating from Rovišće in Bjelovar-Bilogora County (northern Croatia). Owners of the castles in Rovišće, Konjščina and Donja Stubica.	
Kovačević	1821–?		Family present on the island of Hvar.	
Kozić	1587–?			
Kraljević	17th-20th century		The family got its nobility in 1694 from Leopold I as a reward for the fight against the Ottoman Empire.	
Kružić	15th–16th century		Noble family originating from Lika region. Petar Kružić (1491–1537), a member of the family, was a soldier (well-known defender of Klis Fortress).	
Kukar	12th–16th century			
Kukuljević	27 October 1490 – 9 December 1649			
Kulmer		Baron; Count	Noble family from the Duchy of Carinthia. Settled in Croatia since the 16th century. Owned Kulmerovi Dvori Castle in Šestine (Zagreb suburb) and Cernik Castle in Cernik village (western Slavonia).	
Kurjaković	13th century–16th century	Duke; Ban	A branch of the Gusić family from Krbava. Bans of Croatia in the 15th and 16th centuries.	
Kurtić	1 August 1519–?			
Kuščić	15th century–present		Noble family from the island of Brač.	
Klarić	14th century-present	Baron	Noble family originating from Dalmatia, Benkovac area.	

== L ==
Name of the family	Timespan	Titles	Notes	Coat of arms
Lacković	1344–present	Voivode; Duke; Ban	Noble family of Bavarian origin. Bans of Croatia in the 14th century. Called Lacković in Croatian and Lackfi in Hungarian.	
Lačničić				
Lapčan	12th century–?			
Laszowski			Noble family of Polish origin	
Lenković	15th century–17th century		Noble family from Lika region. Ivan Lenković (died in 1569), a member of the family, was a Croatian army general and the leader of Uskoks at their headquarters in Senj.	
Lipić	1683–present			
Loredan	14th century – present	List	Noble family and political dynasty from Venice. Historically owned land and were present in Istria and Dalmatia, notably Barban, Rakalj, Pula, Zadar, Ugljan and Split, holding noble, political and ecclesiastical titles.	
Lukarić	1283–17th century		Old noble family from the Republic of Dubrovnik	

== M ==
Name of the family	Timespan	Titles	Notes	Coat of arms
Madi	10th–11th century		Old noble family from Zadar, northern Dalmatia. Helen of Zadar, a member of the family, was the Queen consort of Croatian King Mchael Krešimir II.	
Magdalenić		Baron	Old noble family from Turopolje, central Croatia. Matija Magdalenić (1625–1704), a member of the family, was a Croatian Kajkavian dialect writer	
Makanec	26 July 1792–present		Noble family from Štrpet, south of Zagreb.Owned some 6 villages and 20 Ha vineyards. Milan Makanec was the first publisher of newspapers in Croatian. Julije Makanec was a Minister of Education in NDH and high-ranking Ustashe.	
Malekovići	1490–present			
Mallin	9 January 1907–?			
Mamić		Duke	Dukes of Livanjsko Polje	
Mandići		Baron		
Maretić	13th century–present	Count Baron	Noble family from Klokoč area	
Maršanić	1674 -present	Duke	Noble family from Grobnik.	
Marušići	13th century–present		Noble family originating from the Oblačić family.	
Martinis	13th century-?		Noble family from Split or the island of Brač.	
Matjačić			Noble family from the Lika region	
Matković	1649–present			
Mendelić	1 August 1519–?			
Menčetić	13th–19th century		Old noble family from the Republic of Dubrovnik	
Mihić	29 July 1808–?		Noble family from Staro Petrovo Selo	
Miković	8 March 1580–present		The nobility was divided by Rudolph II., the original coat of arms is kept in the Turopolje Museum, part of the family moved to live in Križevačka County. The new coat of arms for one of the branches of the Mikovic family was established on November 18, 1699, according to a charter sent by Leopold I.	
Mikulanić	16th century–present			
Mikulčić	17th century–present			
Milašin			Noble family from Bosnia	
Milić	1881–present		Noble family from the Žumberak region	
Mlakovečki	16–17th century	Baron	Noble family of Hungarian origin (Malakóczi). Owned parts of Međimurje, Krapina-Zagorje and Zagreb County. Called Mlakovečki in Croatian.	
Mlinarić	1655–present	Voivode; Herzog	Noble family of Croatian origin who were divided into several branches: Croatia (Mlinarić), Hungary (Mlinarics), Styria (Mlinarič) and others.	
Modrić	1 August 1519–present		Old noble family from the Zadar hinterland. The first written record of the family was in 1519, in Križevci. Confirmed as nobility in 1649.	
Morovićki	12th century–?		Related to the Gutkeled family	
Morić			Noble family from Varaždin	
Mrzlić	14th century - present		Noble family of Austrian - German origin, from House of Habsburg-Lorraine. A village in Istria and a small town in Germany is named after the family.	

== N ==
Name of the family	Timespan	Titles	Notes	Coat of arms
Negovetić	14 October 1687–?			
Nelipić	1244–1434	Duke	Old Croatian noble family originating from Dalmatia. Owners of Knin Fortress, Klis Fortress, Drniš and large estates in northern Dalmatia.	
Nicolini			Noble family of Italian origin from the island of Hvar	
Nikolić		Baron	Vera Nikolić Podrinska (1886–1972), a member of the family, was a Croatian painter.	
Novosel	18th century–19th century		Younger nobility which was granted nobility status by Maria Theresa in 1744. The family resided in the Zagreb County.	

== O ==
Name of the family	Timespan	Titles	Notes	Coat of arms
Odescalchi	13th century–present	Duke	Noble family of Italian origin. Owned large estates in former Syrmia County (including the town of Ilok) between 1697 and 1945.	
Okići	sometime between 12th and 14th c.	Counts and dukes	Native noble family from Okić, region of Samobor	
Orehovečki	1300–present	Count (since 1690)	Native noble family from Sveti Petar Orehovec, Koprivnica-Križevci County (northern Croatia); owners of Veliki Kalnik Castle and Mali Kalnik Castle	
Orešković	1500–present	Duke (since 1645); Baron (since 1761); Duke (since 1600)	Noble family from Lika. Owners of the Široka Kula Castle.	
Orsini	1500–present	Duke	Noble family of Italian origin	
Oršić	1420–present	Baron (since 1675); Count (since 1744)	Noble family originating from Drinić, a village in the former Pset County in central medieval Croatia. Owned estates in Slavetić, Gornja Bistra, Gornja Stubica and Jurketinec. Members of the family were generals in the Habsburg Imperial Army.	
Otmić	13th century–?			
Ožegović	15th century–?	Baron (since 1858)		

== P ==
Name of the family	Timespan	Titles	Notes	Coat of arms
Palfi		Ban	Noble family of Hungarian origin (Pálffy). Count János Pálffy is a prominent member.	
Palmotić	1157–18th century		Old noble family from the Republic of Dubrovnik	
Papalić	14th century–1739			
Patačić	c. 1400–1817	Baron (since 1706); Count (since 1735)	Noble family originating from medieval Bosnia. Owners of Milengrad, Vrbovec, Rakovec, Vinica and some other estates in northern Croatia.	
Pavković	1 August 1519–?			
Pavleković	9 September 1613–?			
Pejačević	14th century–present	Baron (since 1712); Count (since 1772); Ban	Noble family originating from southeastern part of medieval Croatia and medieval Bosnia. Most notable in Slavonia. Bans of Croatia in the 19th and 20th centuries	
Peranski	15th century–786	Duke	Branch of the Šubić family	
Pešćenjak	1 August 1519–?			
Planiški	1 August 1519–?			
Pogledić			Noble family from Turopolje	
Pokos			Noble family from Zagreb	
Pola (Castropola)	983–present	Baron (since 1299); Count (since 1401)	Old noble family of Italian origin. Lords of Pula until 1331.	
Posedarski		Duke		
Pucić	?–20th century	Count (since 1688)	Old noble family from the Republic of Dubrovnik	
Pušić	1659–present			
Prstec			Noble family from Zagreb	

== R ==
Name of the family	Timespan	Titles	Notes	Coat of arms
Radić	16th century–1726		Noble family from the Lika region. Members of the family were Uskok military leaders at the headquarters in Senj. Duke of Senj in 1600. Michael Radić was appointed Duke of Senj on 1 December 1600, by king Rudolf in Graz.	
Radik	1629–?			
Radošević			Noble family from the island of Hvar	
Ranjina	13th century–19th century	Count	Old noble family from the Republic of Dubrovnik	
Raškaj	13th century–present		Branch of the Gutkeled family	
Ratkaj	c. 1400–1793	Baron (since 1559); Count (since 1687)	Noble family of Hungarian origin (Rattkay). Owners of large estates in northern Croatia including Veliki Tabor Castle and Mali Tabor Castle. Called Ratkaj in Croatian.	
Ratković			Noble family from Šibenik	
Rauch		Ban Baron (since 1763)	Noble family of German origin. Levin Rauch was Ban of Croatia between 1868 and 1871.	
Reiner	22 February 1913–?			
Restić	?–19th century		Old noble family from the Republic of Dubrovnik	
Ritter Vitezović	17th century–1713	Baron (since 1710)	Noble family of German and Croatian origin. Settled in Senj. Pavao Ritter Vitezović (1652–1713), a member of the family, was a famous Croatian writer, historian, linguist and publisher.	
Rubido	12th century–present	Count	Noble family of Spanish origin. Settled in Croatia in the 19th century. Sidonija Erdödy Rubido (1819–1884), a member of the family, was opera primadonna and an important member of the Illyrian movement.	
Rudić	1755–?	Baron (since 17 August 1854)	The family had estates in Bač.	

== S ==
Name of the family	Timespan	Titles	Notes	Coat of arms
Sakač	13th century–?		Noble family from Kapela Kalnička and Vojnovec Kalnički Stjepan Krizin Sakač, Jesuit and Croatian historian.	
Saraka	1172–present	Count (since 1817)	Old noble family from the Republic of Dubrovnik	
Scampicchio	15th century–?		Noble family of Italian origin	
Sente	1718–present			
Sermage		Count (since 1723); Baron (since 1720)	Noble family of Burgundian origin. Owned a lot of estates in Croatia (Susedgrad, Medvedgrad, Novi Dvori near Zaprešić, Oroslavje, Klenovnik Castle, Veliki Kalnik Castle, etc.)	
Sladojević	16th century–present		Noble family from Dalmatia. Possibly originated in Bosnia.	
Smolčić	17th century-present	Duke	Medieval noble family originally from Lika. The title and coat of arms were awarded by King Ferdinand III, dated Regensburg, on August 15, 1641, for Lukas Szmolchich, his son Johann, and daughter Helena, who were already of noble birth. Published in the Croatian Parlamentum Publicum in 1643.	
Snačić	11th century–1097	King	Royal dynasty of medieval Kingdom of Croatia, originating from northern Dalmatia. Petar Snačić, a member of the family, was King of Croatia between 1093 and 1097.	
Sorkočević	1272–19th century		Old noble family from the Republic of Dubrovnik	
Spanheim	12th century–?	Margrave	Noble family of German origin. Owners of Istria between 1090 and 1173.	
Srdanović	1624–19th century (?)	Duke	Marko Srdanović is known as Duke of Omiš in 1628. In posterior years was Duke Grgu, who died fighting against the Turkish and Tađa Srdanovic.	
Stankovački	16th century	Ban	Gašpar Stankovački, a member of the family, was Ban of Croatia between 1595 and 1596	
Stipanov	11th century–1896	Count (since 1890); Ban	Ivan Stipanov (1811–1896), a member of the family, was Ban of Croatia between 1860 and 867.	
Stipanovic	1592–present	Duke	In the second census of soldiers from 1551, the name of Mikula Stipanović, a junior officer in the Austrian army, appears. Tsar Rudolf II in Prague, on March 15, 1591, he awarded Gašpar (Kaspar) Stipanović, the son of Duke Mihovil Stipanović, the title of nobleman of the Holy Roman Empire . The seal with the initials of Duke Gašpar Stipanović is today stored in the Croatian State Archives in Zagreb.	
Székely	?–present			

== Š ==
Name of the family	Timespan	Titles	Notes	Coat of arms
Šagud	1 August 1519–?			
Šetka	?–present		Old noble family from Herzegovina	
Šilobod	February 27, 1758–20th Century		Noble family from Podgrađe Podokićko as part of the Kingdom of Croatia (Habsburg). The title awarded to Lt. Andrija Šilobod and his son Johan (Ivan) for military services in the Croatian Military Frontier. Andrija is the father of Mihalj Šilobod Bolšić.	
Šokčević	18th century–1896	Baron (since 1860); Ban	Josip Šokčević (1811–1896), a member of the family, was Ban of Croatia between 1860 and 1867.	
Špišić	11 November 1503 - Present		The family originates from the Japra River basin in the medieval Slavonia (today the area of the northwestern Bosnia). Due to the Ottoman conquests, in the 16th century they moved to the northern parts of Croatia (Blatnica near Karlovac and the surroundings. King Vladislav granted the title in Budapest to this family on 11.11.1503, and the nobility itself was confirmed and declared in the Virovitica County in 1785 when the head of the family was Japra Ladislav. The family is directly connected to the village of Špišić Bukovica (formerly Donja Bukovica) near Virovitica, which was named after them, and where they built a manor house at the end of the 18th century.	
Šubić	11th century–1456	Župan; Duke; Ban	Old noble family known as Dukes of Bribir. Bans of Croatia in the 13th and 14th century	
Šurmanović	1787–?		Noble family from Hrašće	

== T ==
Name of the family	Timespan	Titles	Notes	Coat of arms
Tahy		Baron; Ban	Noble family of Hungarian origin. Owned estates in Croatia (Susedgrad, Donja Stubica, Božjakovina). Ivan Tahy, a member of the family, was Ban of Croatia between 1524 and 1525.	
Talovac	15th century	Baron; Ban	Noble family originating from the island of Korčula, southern Dalmatia. Matko Talovac, a member of the family, was Ban of Slavonia between 1435 and 1445.	
Tavelić	14th century	Knez	Noble family originating from the island of Hvar and Šibenik. Nikola Tavelić was a member of this family.	
Tartaglia	12th century–present	Count	Noble family of Italian origin from Split	
Thybold			vNoble family from Psunj	
Tomašić			Noble family from Split and Brač	
Topolski			Noble family of Polish origin from the parent family of Nałęcz.	
Tončić-Sorinj			Noble family originating from the island of Rab. Lujo Tončić-Sorinj (1915–2005), a member of the family, was an Austrian diplomat and politician.	
Trpimirović	845–1091	Duke (since 845); King (since 925)	Ruling dynasty of the medieval Kingdom of Croatia	
Tudišević	?–19th century		Old noble family from the Republic of Dubrovnik. Called Tudišević in Croatian and Tudisi in Italian.	
Tugomirić				
Tumpić	16th century–present		Noble family from Bihać area. Moved to Hrvatsko Zagorje because of the Ottoman invasions.	
Turković	17th century–present	Baron (since 1911)	Noble family originating from Senj. Since 1882 landowners in Kutjevo, central Slavonia.	

== U ==
Name of the family	Timespan	Titles	Notes	Coat of arms
Ugrinić	c. 1300–1586		Cadet branch of the Šubić noble family. Owners of Visovac and Rog Castle in northern Dalmatia.	
Ungnad	15th century–present	Baron (since 1522); Count; Ban	Noble family of Austrian origin. Krsto Ungnad, a member of the family, was Ban of Croatia between 1578 and 1583.	
Utješinović	15th century–16th century		Noble family originating from northern Dalmatia and Lika region. Juraj Utješinović (1482–1551), a member of the family, was a Catholic cardinal and a Hungarian statesman.	

== V ==
Name of the family	Timespan	Titles	Notes	Coat of arms
Valjak	12th century–present			
Vidović	17th century–present		Noble family originating from Rotčoj Vasi and Maholcima u Bužanima gained recognition from emperor Ferdinand III.	
Vitovec	15th century–?	Baron; Count; Ban	Noble family of Czech origin. Jan Vitovec, a member of the family, was Ban of Slavonia between 1457 and 1463.	
Vlašić	16th century–present	Baron (since 1832); Ban	Noble family originating from northern Dalmatia and Lika region. Franjo Vlašić, a member of the family, was Ban of Croatia between 1832 and 1840.	
Vojković	13th century–20th century	Count (since 1763)	Noble family from Klokoč in the Kordun region (central Croatia). Owned estates with castles and manor houses in Oroslavje, Zabok, Lužnica, Brdovec, Rakitje, Donja Stubica etc.	
Vrančić	14th century–17th century		Noble family from Šibenik, northern Dalmatia. Antun Vrančić (1504–1573) and his nephew Faust Vrančić (1551–1617) were famous Croatian writers, diplomats, polymaths and bishops.	
Vranyczany-Dobrinović	13th century–present	Baron (since 1862)	Noble family originating from medieval Bosnia. Settled in Vranjic, central Dalmatia, in the 15th century.	
Vukasović	15th century–1844	Baron (since 1785)	Noble family from the Lika region. Settled in Senj in the 16th century. Josip Filip Vukasović (1755–1809), a member of the family, was a high-ranking general in the Habsburg Imperial Army.	
Vukašinović			Noble family from the island of Hvar	
Vukalić			Noble family from the Lika region	
Vukšić	1 August 1519–?			
Vernić	16th century–?	Count (since 1630)	Noble family from Turopolje	

== Z ==
Name of the family	Timespan	Titles	Notes	Coat of arms
Zaboki	15 August 1575–?			
Zagrajski			Noble family of Polish origin	
Zapolja	14th century–1571	King; Duke; Ban	Noble family originating from Zapolje in the modern Rešetari municipality, Slavonia. Ivan Zapolja (John Zápolya), a member of the family, was the anti-king of Croatia in personal union with Hungary between 1526 and 1540.	
Zdenčaj	21 March 1582–present			
Zdunić	February 1693–present	Count	Noble family, closely related to Krmpotić family. Originated in the region of Lika, city of Senj. The nobility charter (which is today kept in Croatian State Archives) was awarded to the family (brothers Juraj, Pavle and Nikola) for extraordinary merit and excellence in the battles against Ottoman invaders, most notably during Austro-Turkish War of 1663 and Great Turkish War, by Leopold I, Holy Roman Emperor, in February 1693. The same wars marked the Ottoman retreat from Hungary. Members of the family survive today, albeit in small numbers. Most of the family members migrated from their homeland during the transatlantic migrations to North and South America where their descendants reside today.	
Zlatarić	15th century–1823		Noble family from the Republic of Dubrovnik	
Zrinski	1347–1703	Duke; Ban; Count (in Austria since 1554)	Branch of old Šubić family, originally from Kingdom of Croatia (during Arpad and Anjou dynasties in 13th and 14th century). From 14th century known as Dukes of Zrin and Bans of Croatia in the 16th and 17th centuries.	

== Ž ==
Name of the family	Timespan	Titles	Notes	Coat of arms
Žugec	16th century–present		Noble family from Turopolje that moved to Hrvatsko Zagorje.	

== See also ==
- Bans of Croatia
- Croatian Military Frontier
- Croatian nobility
- History of Croatia
- Hundred Years' Croatian–Ottoman War
- Kingdom of Croatia (925–1102)
- Kingdom of Croatia (Habsburg)
- Kingdom of Croatia-Slavonia
- Kingdom of Dalmatia
- Kingdom of Slavonia
- Kings of Croatia
- Turkish Croatia
- Twelve noble tribes of Croatia
