= Pragmatic Sanction of 1723 =

Succession treaty in Hungary

The Pragmatic Sanction of 1723 was a bilateral treaty between the Diet of Hungary and the Hungarian king Charles III by which the Diet recognized the king's daughters (failing which his nieces and sisters) as possible heirs to the throne in return for considerable privileges. It was a protracted affair but had lasting consequences, especially in relation to the Austro-Hungarian Compromise of 1867.

== Background ==
The future succession to the throne of the Kingdom of Hungary became contentious on the accession of the childless Charles III (also Holy Roman Emperor as Charles VI), the last male of the House of Habsburg, in 1711. The Hungarian crown had become a hereditary possession of the Habsburgs in 1687 but only men could inherit it. Charles had privately agreed with his older brother and predecessor, King Joseph I, on the Mutual Pact of Succession in 1703. The Mutual Pact provided for female succession to the Habsburg monarchy in the event of extinction of the male line, but gave precedence to the daughters of the older rather than surviving brother. Charles wished to secure all his hereditary realms for his own daughter, should he have any.

== Hungarian objections ==
Refusing to make constitutional concessions, Charles failed to gain the Hungarian approval during the 1712 negotiations. The Croatian estates, despite their centuries long association with Hungary, issued their own Pragmatic Sanction in 1712, unilaterally approving Charles's intention and causing Hungarian discontent. Charles formalized his intention by issuing the Pragmatic Sanction of 1713, emphasizing the indivisibility of the Habsburg domains and the rights of his future daughters. At the assembly of the Diet of Hungary in 1715, Charles agreed that the Diet should elect a king if he died without a male heir. He was still hoping for a son; a male child was indeed born in 1716 but died the same year.

By the end of the 1710s, Charles had been left with only two children, daughters named Maria Theresa (born in 1717) and Maria Anna (born in 1718). His nieces, Maria Josepha and Maria Amalia, agreed to cede their claim to Maria Theresa and Maria Anna, significantly facilitating the acceptance of the Pragmatic Sanction of 1713 by the great powers of Europe. Charles's intentions were not yet accepted by all of his realms, however, with the County of Tyrol and the Kingdom of Hungary objecting. The Hungarians believed that the 1687 agreement to hereditary succession by male Habsburgs already went too far and opposed extending it to Habsburg women, preferring instead to revert to an elective monarchy. The Kingdom of Croatia and the Principality of Transylvania, two separately administered lands of the Hungarian Crown, autonomously approved the King's will in 1721 and 1722 respectively.

== Agreement ==
In 1722, Charles led informal discussions with the Hungarians, placating them with numerous land grants. When the Diet assembled in Pressburg that year, Charles succeeded in having his proposals submitted to the lower house. The chances of accepting his proposals were slim. The Primate of Hungary, Christian August of Saxe-Zeitz, was prevented from presiding over the lower house's deliberations due to fears that his sympathy for Joseph I would incline him to oppose setting Joseph's daughters aside in favor of Charles's. Ferenc Szluha, a county notary of Pozsony, gave a rousing speech in the King's favor, unexpectedly securing the lower house's support. The upper house followed suit.

The Diet thus agreed in 1723 to extend the succession rights to the daughters of Charles III (Maria Theresa and Maria Anna), followed by the daughters of Joseph I (Maria Josepha and Maria Amalia), and finally by the daughters of Leopold I (Maria Elisabeth, Maria Anna and Maria Magdalena). Royal elections were to resume if these lines were to go extinct. The Diet agreed that Hungary was inseparable from the rest of the Habsburg monarchy and emphasized the need for common action, especially when it came to defense. In return, Charles solemnly reconfirmed the rights of the estates of the realm and in particular those of the Hungarian nobility.

The Pragmatic Sanction of 1723 had great impact on the Austro-Hungarian Compromise of 1867. The Hungarian statesman Ferenc Deák argued that, according to the Pragmatic Sanction of 1723, constitutional governing of Hungary was a prerequisite of the Habsburg rule over Hungary. The foreign policy and defense, as well as financing them, were the most important joint affairs of Austria-Hungary, the resulting dual monarchy, to be based on the Pragmatic Sanction of 1723.

== See also ==
- War of the Austrian Succession –armed conflict over the implementation of the Pragmatic Sanction

== Bibliography ==
- Ingrao, Charles W. (2000). The Habsburg Monarchy, 1618–1815. Cambridge University Press. ISBN 1107268699.
- Sugar, Peter F. (1994). A History of Hungary. Indiana University Press. ISBN 025320867X.
- Péter, László (2012). Lojkó, Miklós (ed.). Hungary's Long Nineteenth Century: Constitutional and Democratic Traditions in a European Perspective. BRILL. ISBN 978-9004222120.
