= Krsto Delišimunović =

Croatian baron and officer (1625–1696)

The Coat of Arms awarded to the Delišimunović family in 1659

Krsto Delišimunović (1625–1696) was a 17th century Croatian military commander and baron. He was a member of the Delišimunović family and served the Habsburg Monarchy.

== Early life ==
Krsto Delišimunović was a descendant of Šimun "Delišimun" Radojčić, a castellan of Klis, and the son of Franjo Delišimunović, the commander of Žumberak. In 1659, his nobility was confirmed by the Holy Roman Emperor Leopold I. In 1665, he married Marija Gusić and adopted her relative, who would take his surname, becoming Franjo Krsto Delišimunović. In 1675, after remaining loyal to the crown during the Magnate Conspiracy, he was awarded the title of Baron and the Turanj Estate.

== Military career ==
Krsto Delišimunović began his military career in his youth, first serving as a cavalry officer in Karlovac. In 1648, he was made captain of Tounj, then Barilovic in 1655, and Turanj in 1670. After his captaincy in Turanj, he was made Vice-General of Karlovac.

== Conflict with Mustaj-beg Hasumović ==
On the 3rd of January 1676, while serving as the captain of Turanj, Delišimunović and his company engaged in combat with the Ottoman folk hero Mustaj-beg Hasumović (Mustay-Bey of Lika). During the battle, Mustaj-beg Hasumović was decapitated. According to Radoslav Lopašić's 1890 chronicle "Bihać i bihaćka krajina", his body fat was cut and filled into three saddlebags while his horses and possessions were distributed to the soldiers. According to contemporary accounts cited by Lopašić, Mustaj-beg Hasumović was despised by the local Christians for his acts of violence and oppression in the region.

== See also ==
- List of Croatian soldiers
- List of Croatian noble families
- Delišimunović
