= Delišimunović =

- The Coat of Arms awarded to the Delišimunović family in 1659
- Parent family: Radojčić
- Country: Habsburg Monarchy; Austria-Hungary
- Place of origin: Klis Fortress
- Founded: 1530-37
- Founder: Šimun "Delišimun" Radojčić

The Delišimunović family is a Croatian noble family originating from Klis Fortress in Split, where they were members of the Uskok military group. They served on the military frontier of the Habsburg Monarchy, later part of the Austro-Hungarian Empire.

== History ==
The Counts Coat of Arms awarded to Franjo Krsto Delišimunović in 1708

The Delišimunović family name has appeared in various forms, including Delisimonovich, Dellisimunovich, Delljsimonovich, and Dellissimunovich. The surname translates to "son of Šimun the brave," derived from the nickname "Delišimun", linked to Šimun Radojčić, the son of Ivan Radojčić.

The family initially resided in Klis Fortress before moving to Pokuplje, where they owned Radojčić Castle near Duga Resa. They later relocated to the Žumberak mountains, where Krsto Delišimunović was granted the title of Noble by Leopold I in 1659. On August 9, 1675, he received the title of Baron. He served as captain of Karlovac until his death in 1696.

Franjo Krsto Delišimunović, Krsto’s son, commanded the Croatian army alongside Franjo Vragović during the uprising of Francis II Rákóczi in 1704. He was elevated to the title of Count in 1708 and participated in the creation of the Croatian Pragmatic Sanction in 1712. He was appointed as one of the envoys tasked with delivering the document to Vienna. He died on the 2nd of May, 1712 before departing for the imperial court.

The family owned properties in Žumberak, including Žumberak Castle, Radojčić Castle, Kostanjevac, and Petričko Selo, as well as southern estates such as Brlog and Drežnik, which they acquired through marriage.

== Notable Members ==
- Šimun Radojčić (16th century), Castellan of Klis
- Petar Delišimunović (16th century), Castellan of Blagaj
- Franjo Delišimunović (17th century), Commander of Žumberak
- János Delišimunović (17th century), Judge in Pécs, Captain of Pécs soldiers during the 1689 Siege of Szigetvar
- Krsto Delišimunović (1625 - 1696), Baron and Vice-General
- Franjo Krsto Delišimunović (1655 - 1712), Count and General who participated in creating the Croatian Pragmatic Sanction
- Petar Delišimunović (17th century - 18th century), Voivode of Slunj
- Karlo Delišimunović (18th century - 1817), Lieutenant Colonel in the Austrian Empire's military
- Franjo Delišimunović (18th century - 19th century), Major in the Austrian Empire's Imperial Guard
- Ignacije Delišimunović (18th century - 19th century), Lieutenant Colonel in the Austrian Empire's military
- Juraj Delišimunović (18th century - 19th century), Second lieutenant in the Austrian Empire's military

Other members who had their nobility confirmed by Leopold I, alongside Krsto Delišimunović, were:

- Andrija Delišimunović
- Gašpar Delišimunović
- Ivan I Delišimunović
- Ivan II Delišimunović
- Juraj Delišimunović
- Matijas I Delišimunović
- Matijas II Delišimunović
- Pavao “de Petrichevacz” Delišimunović
- Petar “de Petrichevacz” Delišimunović

== See also ==
- Croatian nobility
- List of noble families of Croatia

== Sources ==
- "Delišimunović". Croatian Encyclopedia.
- "Povijest". delisimunovic.com.
- "Delišimunovići". Hrvatska enciklopedija P. 620.
- "Žumberački vojskovođa". uskok-sosice.hr.
