= Pragmatic sanction =

Type of royal or governmental decree

A pragmatic sanction is a sovereign's solemn decree on a matter of primary importance and has the force of fundamental law. In the late history of the Holy Roman Empire, it referred more specifically to an edict issued by the Emperor.

When used as a proper noun, and the year is not mentioned, it usually refers to the Pragmatic Sanction of 1713, a legal mechanism designed to ensure that the Austrian throne and Habsburg lands would be inherited by Emperor Charles VI's daughter, Maria Theresa.

Pragmatic sanctions tend to be issued at times in which the theoretically ideal situation is untenable, and a change of the rules is called for. In the Pragmatic Sanction of 1713, for example, the edict streamlined the succession laws and reorganized the Habsburg territories into an indivisible entity so that one heir would inherit them.

== Examples ==
- The Pragmatic Sanction of Justinian I, promulgated in August 554, on the reorganization of Italy following the Gothic War.
- The so-called Pragmatic Sanction of Louis IX, purporting to have been issued in March 1269, regarding various clerical reforms, was a forgery fabricated in the 15th century.
- The Pragmatic Sanction of Bourges, issued on July 7, 1438 by King Charles VII of France, limited the authority of the pope over the Church within France.
- The German Pragmatic Sanction of 1439, issued by German ruling princes March 26, 1439, accepted some of the decrees of the Council of Basel with modifications. It has been argued that the name Pragmatic Sanction is not properly applied to this document, as it was issued by princes subordinate to the emperor without the emperor's endorsement.
- The Pragmatic Sanction of 1549, issued by Holy Roman Emperor Charles V, established the Seventeen Provinces as one entity.
- The Pragmatic Sanction of 1713 issued by Emperor Charles VI on April 19, 1713, by which the Habsburg hereditary possessions (Austria, Bohemia, Hungary, and various other smaller lands) were allowed to pass to a woman (specifically Maria Theresa) if Charles VI had no male heirs.
  - The Croatian Pragmatic Sanction of 1712, passed by the Diet of the Habsburg Kingdom of Croatia and predating the Austrian decree, allowing the Croatian throne to pass to the female line of the House of Habsburg.
  - The Pragmatic Sanction of 1723 passed by the Hungarian Parliament, accepting female inheritance in the Kingdom of Hungary. Charles VI had permitted Hungary to revert to elective monarchy should he die without a male heir; this instrument signalled the Hungarian parliament's acceptance of his choice of successor.
- The Pragmatic Sanction of Naples, issued October 6, 1759, by King Charles III of Spain, governed the succession to the thrones of Naples, Sicily, and Spain, and forbade the union of Spain and the Two Sicilies.
- The Spanish Pragmatic Sanction of 1776, issued 23 March 1776, limited the options of marriage for members of the royal family.
- The Spanish Pragmatic Sanction of 1830, issued March 29, 1830 by King Ferdinand VII of Spain, ratified a Decree of 1789 by Charles IV of Spain, which had replaced the semi-Salic system established by Philip V with the male-preference primogeniture system that had historically characterized the Castilian monarchy (upon which the Spanish monarchy draws its traditions), as exemplified by the inheritance by queens regnant Urraca, Isabella I, and Joanna. (See also Carlism.)
