= Novoselić =

Novoselić is a Croatian surname. Notable people with the surname include:

- Krist Novoselic (born 1965), American musician
- Sofija Novoselić (born 1990), Croatian alpine skier

== See also ==
- Novosel
