= Turanj =

Turanj may refer to:

- Turanj, Karlovac, a suburb in Croatia
- Turanj, Zadar County, a village near Sveti Filip i Jakov, Croatia
