= Shumen Municipality =

Shumen Municipality Община Шумен
- Municipality
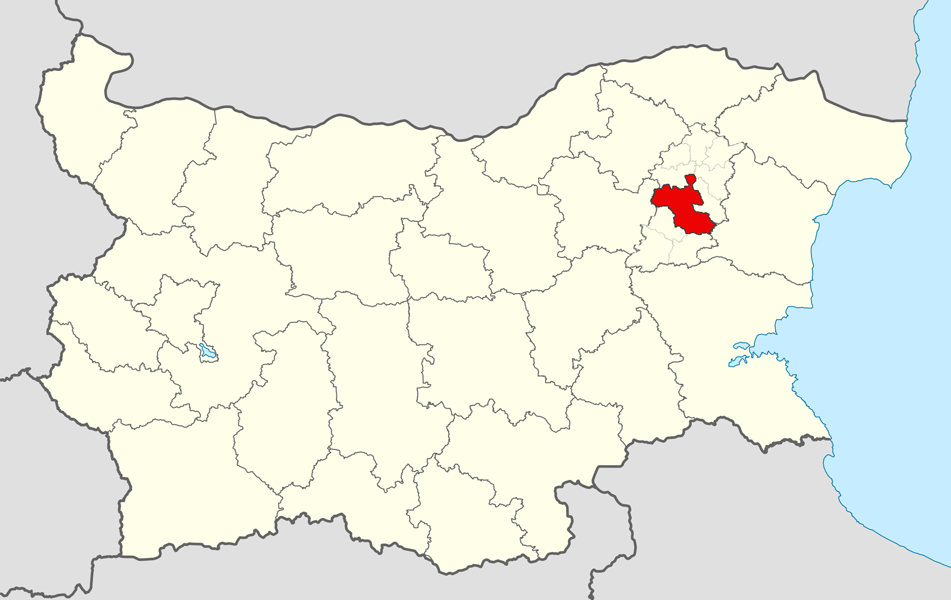
- Shumen Municipality within Bulgaria and Shumen Province.
- Coordinates: 43°13′N 26°59′E
- Country: Bulgaria
- Province (Oblast): Shumen
- Admin. centre (Obshtinski tsentar): Shumen

Area
  - Total: 630 km^{2} (240 sq mi)

Population (December 2009)
  - Total: 101,597
  - Density: 160/km^{2} (420/sq mi)
- Time zone: UTC+2 (EET)
  - Summer (DST): UTC+3 (EEST)

Shumen Municipality (Bulgarian: Община Шумен) is a municipality (obshtina) in Shumen Province, Northeastern Bulgaria. It is named after its administrative centre - the city of Shumen which is also the capital of the province.

The municipality embraces a territory of 630 km^{2} (240 sq mi) with a population of 101,597 inhabitants, as of December 2009. Currently, the eastern operating section of Hemus motorway connects the main town with the port of Varna.

Aside from the rich cultural landmarks of the main city, the area is most known with the National Historical and Archaeological Reserve that includes the famous Madara Rider near the homonymous village.

== Settlements ==
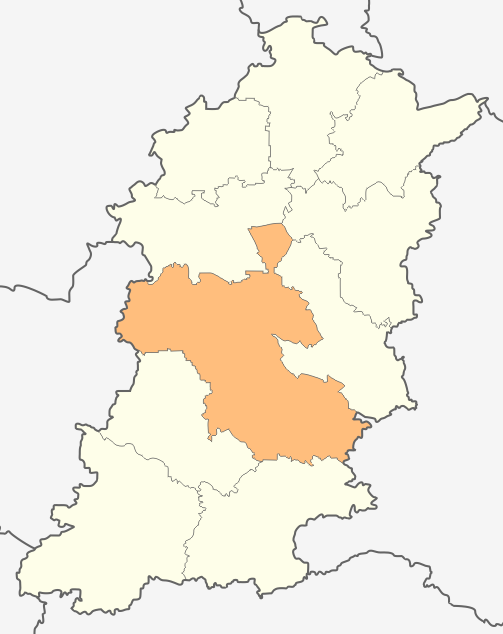
Shumen Municipality within Shumen Province

Shumen Municipality includes the following 27 places (towns are shown in bold):

Town/Village	Cyrillic	Population (December 2009)
**Shumen**	**Шумен**	86,824
Belokopitovo	Белокопитово	158
Blagovo	Благово	108
Cherencha	Черенча	471
Dibich	Дибич	1,132
Drumevo	Друмево	1,049
Gradishte	Градище	800
Ivanski	Ивански	1,649
Iliya Blaskovo	Илия Блъсково	509
Kladenets	Кладенец	105
Konyovets	Коньовец	433
Kostena Reka	Костена река	74
Lozevo	Лозево	387
Madara	Мадара	1,281
Marash	Мараш	626
Novosel	Новосел	557
Ovcharovo	Овчарово	168
Panayot Volovo	Панайот Волово	356
Radko Dimitrievo	Радко Димитриево	337
Salmanovo	Салманово	915
Srednya	Средня	344
Struino	Струино	394
Tsarev Brod	Царев брод	1,314
Vasil Drumev	Васил Друмев	355
Velino	Велино	368
Vetrishte	Ветрище	218
Vehtovo	Вехтово	665
Total		101,597

== Demography ==
The following table shows the change of the population during the last four decades. Since 1992 Shumen Municipality has comprised the former municipality of Ivanski and the numbers in the table reflect this unification.

Shumen Municipality
Year	1975	1985	1992	2001	2005	2007	2009	2011
Population	94,777	109,490	110,170	104,473	101,515	101,780	101,597	93,649
Sources: Census 2001, Census 2011, „pop-stat.mashke.org“,

=== Ethnic composition ===
According to the 2011 census, among those who answered the optional question on ethnic identification, the ethnic composition of the municipality was the following:

Ethnic group	Population	Percentage
Bulgarians	68781	78.7%
Turks	13179	15.1%
Roma (Gypsy)	4042	4.6%
Others	721	0.8%
Undeclared	654	0.7%

==== Religion ====
According to the latest Bulgarian census of 2011, the religious composition, among those who answered the optional question on religious identification, was the following:

Religious composition of Shumen Municipality
Orthodox Christianity	72.9%
Catholicism	0.4%
Protestantism	1.0%
Islam	17.0%
No religion	2.4%
Prefer not to answer, others and indefinable	6.3%

== See also ==
- Provinces of Bulgaria
- Municipalities of Bulgaria
- List of cities and towns in Bulgaria
