= Belošević =

Belošević is a surname. Notable people with the surname include:

- Dino Belošević (born 1985), Croatian kickboxer
- Ilija Belošević (born 1972), Serbian basketball referee
- Ivan Belošević (1909–1987), Croatian footballer
- Mike Belosevic, Canadian immunologist
- Obrad Belošević (1928–1986) Serbian basketball referee
- Zoran Belošević (born 1983), Serbian footballer

== See also ==
- Beloš
