= Mlinarić family =

Croatian noble family

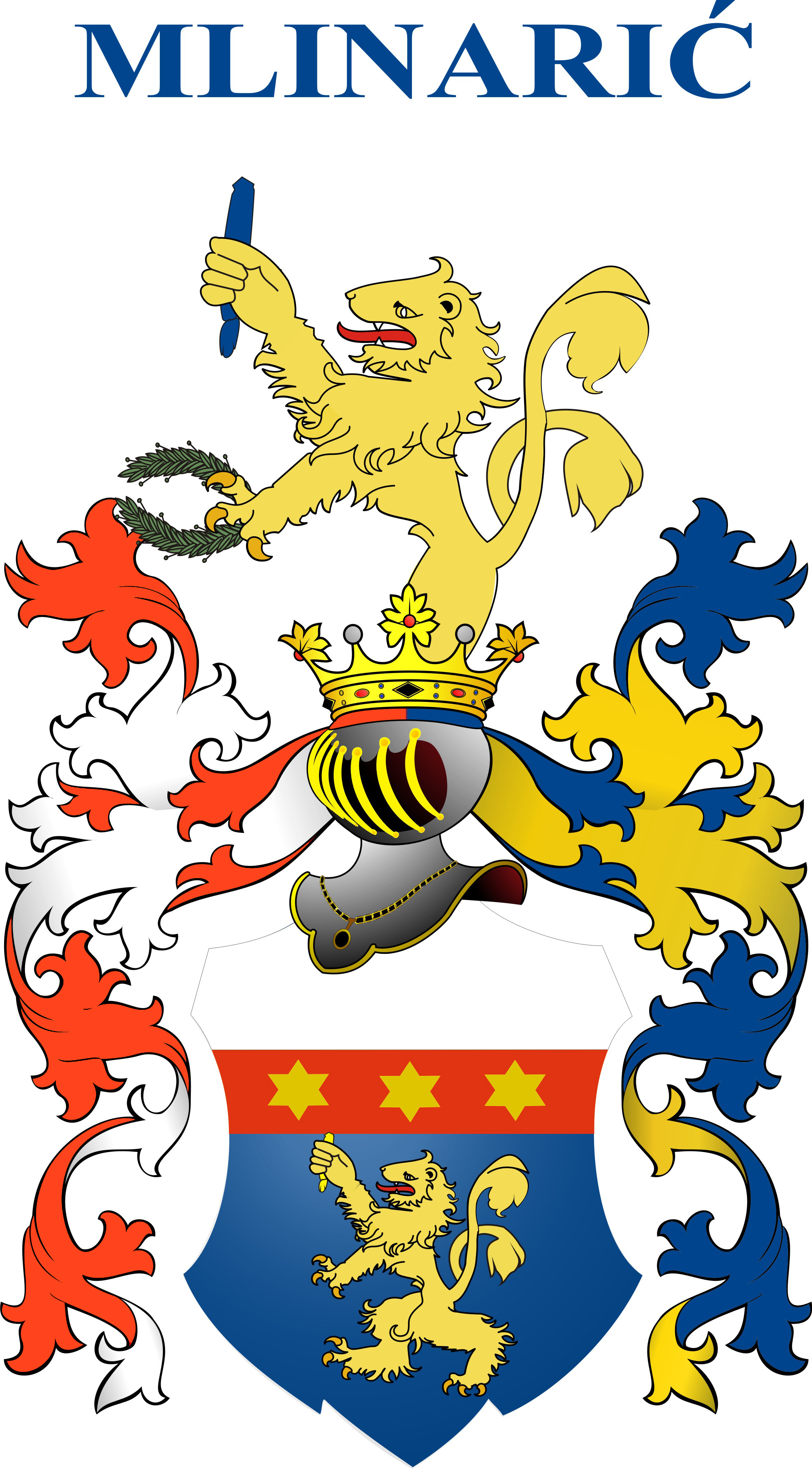
Coat of arms of the Mlinarić family

The Mlinarić family (Mlinarich) was the name of a noted Croatian noble family.

== History ==
King Ferdinand III confirmed on 20 March 1655 in Pressburg nobility and armorial, Matthew Mlinarić and his brother Ambroz. Family of Croatian origin who were divided into several branches: Croatia (Mlinarić), Hungary (Mlinarics), Styria (Mlinarič) ... and the other versions. In the book Wappenbuch der Adel von Kroatien und Slavonien (Tal.89.), Issued in Nuremberg in 1899. Dr. Ivan von Bojničić mentioned a Croatian branch of the family. Since the noble title was confirmed, there are indications that the surname was also written as Molinus, Mollini and De Molin where they also had noble titles in Dalmatia and Istria in Republic of Venice.

== Coat of arms ==
- Shield (Engrailed - country or countries), with three horizontal colors (in order from the top silver, red and blue), red shades (three stars - belt - military belt or homage), and blue Lion Passant guardant helical rod (signs secular power).
- Helmet (silver helmet turned sideways in profile (right), with gold bars and ornaments) above the shield (more nobility).
- On the helmet is the crown (five peaks, which are trefoil - heraldic "The crown of the French princes") from which springs Lion Rampant helical rod (signs of secular power) and garland (represented by a token of appreciation, which would let the lady gave her knight when went to war), green (hope, joy and loyalty in love)
- The cloak in colors (Blue - fidelity and truth, Red - military courage and generosity, Gold - generosity, Silver - peace and tranquility)

== Data on family ==
Due to the large turbulence in the area of the Austro-Hungarian Empire (Zrinsko-Frankopan conspiracy, Croatian - Ottomans wars ...etc.) at that time a large number of data on the Croatian branch of the family Mlinarić is destroyed. The family appears in the history of the many military, religious, law and other positions. One of the brothers Matthew Mlinarić (who received a certificate of nobility 20.th March 1655. Year of King Ferdinand III ), and Matthias Mlinarič (Styrias surname version) are mentioned in Smičiklas "Spomenici Tržičkih Frankopana". Hungarian version of the surname is Mlinarics (confirmation as Hungary nobility 24. February 1650 in Vienna), Bohemian-Moravian Mlinarick or Mlinarik (M. Miklos nobility from 1621), all these versions surnames appear as Mlinarich, which is universal for the entire area of the Austro-Hungarian Empire. Surname can be found in version Muller/Miller/Muhlen, parts of family who moved to other parts of the monarchy (mostly part of German speaking) and Molin/Molnius/Mollinary/Molinari (part of Italian speaking).

The records from Smičiklas book "Codex diplomaticus regni Croatiae Dalmatiae et Slavoniae" on page 398-th to 399-th, in the text of 10 December 1398. in Knin. Where it is mentioned so far the first known written record of the surname Mlinarić (Mlinarich). Therefore, it is assumed that this nobility is much older than confirmation date (M. Miklos 1621.-th, Mlinarics 1650-th and Mlinarić 1655-th).

=== Kačić clan ===
The mythology of the surname is connected with Muchlo and the legend of the arrival of seven tribes, which comes from the mountain Muhl (Upper Austria).

The famous historian Vjekoslav Klaic in his book "Hrvatska plemena od XII. do do XVI. stoljeća", published in Zagreb 1897. Describes history of the Kačić, one of the twelve tribes of the Croatian Kingdom who had the right to elect the king. At one point he writes: "The main knee Kačića had his estate in the upper Adriatic and here was elevated to the height of his fame, and his family was so mushroomed that the same last name they could not discern. Mlinarić referred to as genera of Kačić clan, on page 35., also confirmed in Smičiklas book "Codex diplomaticus Regni Croatiae, Dalmatiae et Slavoniae".

== Family nickname ==
The old recorded family nickname was "Melina", "Mile", "Milesi", "Milne", "Miler", "Mlinari", "Molniusi" and "Molina", while more recently nicknamed "Mlinka" or "Mlina"

== See also ==
- List of noble families of Croatia

== Notes ==
- Der Adel von Kroatien und Slavonien - Ivan Bojničić - Nürnbergu 1899.
- Hrvatska plemena od XII. do do XVI. stoljeća - Vjekoslav Klaić - Zagreb 1897.
- Tadija Smičiklas, Codex diplomaticus regni Croatiae Dalmatiae et Slavoniae (AB ANNO 503. USQDE AD ANNUM 1102.), Zagreb 1874, (page 398th-399th)
- A Magyar Nemzeti Múzeum Könyvtárának czímereslevelei by Országos Széchényi Könyvtár; Áldásy, Antal, 1869–1932; Czobor, Alfréd, Published 1904, Topics Országos Széchényi Könyvtár, Crests, Nobility''
- Magyar nemes családok VII.- Maár-Nyizsnyay - Budapest 1913.
- Magyar nemes családok 11. kötet, Vaál-Zsyska (1932)
