= Franjo Delišimunović =

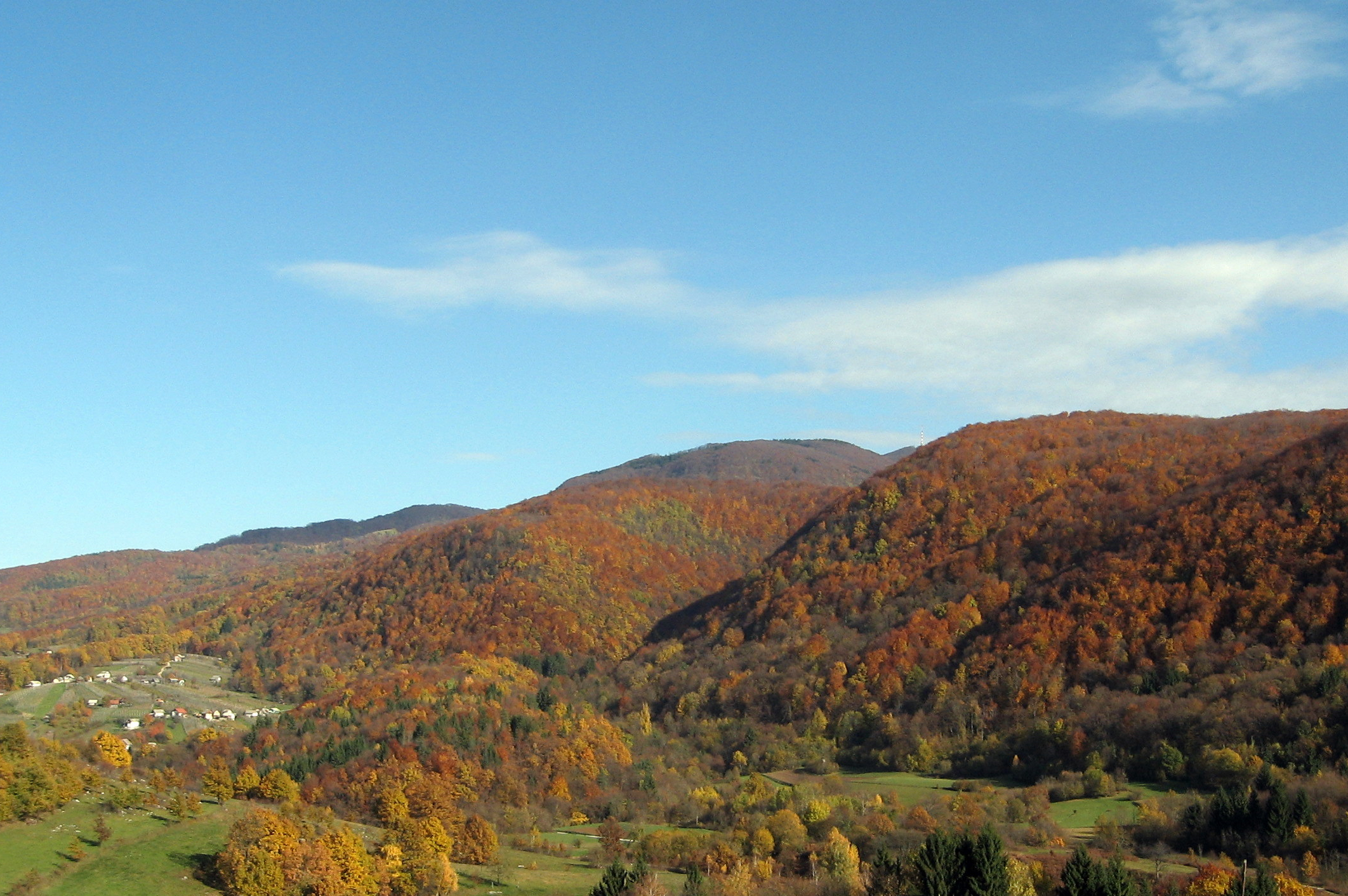
Photograph of the Zumberak Mountains

Franjo Delišimunović was a 17th century Croatian noble, Uskok and military officer from the Žumberak region. He was a member of the Delišimunović family and served the Habsburg Monarchy. He was the son of Petar Delišimunović and the father of Krsto Delišimunović. Franjo held the estates of Kostanjevac and Petričko Selo.

== Military career ==
Franjo served as the vice-captain of the Žumberak Uskoks, being appointed to the role in 1636. Later, he is referenced in Siebmachers Wappenbuch as the "Commandant von Sichelburg" (Commander of Zumberak).

== See also ==
- List of Croatian soldiers
- List of Croatian noble families
- Delišimunović
