= Kraljević =

Kraljević and Kraljevič (sometimes written Kraljevic or Kraljevich) is a surname of Montenegrin, Serbian and Croatian origin.

== Notable people ==
- Anđeo Kraljević (1807-1879), Apostolic vicar of Herzegovina
- Ivan Kraljevic (born 1975), Montenegrin film director
- Mateja Kraljevic (born 1993), Swiss tennis player
- Luka Kraljević (born 1997), Slovenian basketball player
- Blaž Kraljević (1947–1992), Bosnian Croat paramilitary leader
- Davor Kraljević (born 1978), Croatian footballer
- Hrvoje Kraljević (born 1944), Croatian mathematician and a former politician
- Joviša Kraljevič (born 1976), Slovenian footballer
- Marko Kraljević (footballer), Croatian footballer
- Miroslav Kraljević (1885–1913), Croatian painter

As a title, it has been used to refer to:

- Prince Marko (c. 1335 – 1395), also known as Marko Kraljević, de jure the Serbian king from 1371 to 1395
