= Franjo Krsto Delišimunović =

Croatian count and general (1655–1712)

The Counts Coat of Arms awarded to Franjo Krsto Delišimunović in 1708

Franjo Krsto Delišimunović (1655–1712) was a Croatian count and general. He was a member of the Delišimunović family and served the Habsburg monarchy. In 1712, he participated in the creation of Croatian Pragmatic Sanction.

== Early life ==
Franjo Krsto was born into the Jelačić family, however after the death of his father, Janko Jelacic, at a young age he was adopted by his relative Krsto Delišimunović and took the Delišimunović name. In 1665, he married Barbara Sidonija Peranski, the daughter of Janko Peranski, a member of the Šubić family. For his military service, Emperor Joseph I elevated Delišimunović to the rank of count on the 17th of April 1708. He was also granted an expanded coat of arms.

== Military career ==
Delišimunović began his service on the Croatian Military Frontier around the Una River in 1693. In 1695, he was made a captain in Sredičko. By 1702 he commanded the districts of Gornje Polje, Glinska and Planinska, where he oversaw fortifications along the frontier with the Ottoman Empire.

During the uprising of Francis II Rákóczi in 1704, he and Franjo Vragović commanded the Croatian army in Upper Hungary. He was promoted to colonel in 1705, and placed in command of the Kostajnica fortress, later suppressing several frontier uprisings, including a Vlach revolt in 1708.

== Political activity ==
In early 1712, Delišimunović served as a military and noble delegate in the Sabor, participating in the creation of the Croatian Pragmatic Sanction, affirming the hereditary rights of the Habsburg line, including female succession. On the 11th of March, 1712, he was appointed as one of the envoys tasked with delivering the document to Vienna. He died on the 2nd of May, 1712 before departing for the imperial court.

== Legacy ==
Following his death, his widow Barbara Sidonija endowed their estates to the Zagreb Cathedral.

== See also ==
- List of Croatian soldiers
- List of Croatian noble families
- Delišimunović
