= Novosel =

Novosel is a Croatian surname. It is one of the most common surnames in two counties of Croatia.

It may refer to:

- Novosel family, Croatian nobility
- Michael J. Novosel (1922–2006), American air force officer
- Mirko Novosel (1938–2023), Croatian basketball player
- Natalie Novosel (born 1989), American basketball player
- Steve Novosel (born 1940), American musician
- Viktorija Novosel (born 1989), Croatian singer

== See also ==
- Krist Novoselic
- Novoselov, a Russian surname
