= Pragmatic Sanction of 1713 =

Holy Roman edict allowing royal inheritance by Charles VI's daughter Maria Theresa

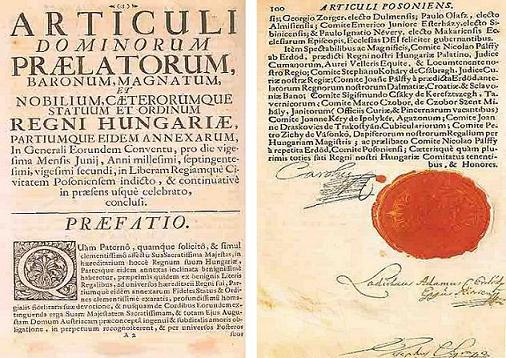
The Pragmatic Sanction, act of Emperor Charles VI

The Pragmatic Sanction of 1713 was an edict issued by Holy Roman Emperor Charles VI, on 19 April 1713 to ensure that the Habsburg monarchy, which included the Archduchy of Austria, the Kingdom of Hungary, the Kingdom of Croatia, the Kingdom of Bohemia, the Duchy of Milan, the Kingdom of Naples, the Kingdom of Sardinia and the Austrian Netherlands, could be inherited by a daughter undivided.

As of 1713, Charles and his wife Elisabeth Christine had not had any children. Since the death of his elder brother, Joseph I, in 1711, Charles had been the sole surviving male member of the House of Habsburg. Joseph had died without male issue, leaving Joseph's daughter Maria Josepha as the heiress presumptive. That presented two problems. First, a prior agreement with his brother, known as the Mutual Pact of Succession (1703), had agreed that in the absence of male heirs, Joseph's daughters would take precedence over Charles's daughters in all Habsburg lands. Though Charles had no children, if he were to be survived by daughters alone, they would be cut out of the inheritance. Secondly, because Salic law precluded female inheritance, Charles VI needed to take extraordinary measures to avoid a protracted succession dispute, as other claimants would have surely contested a female inheritance.

Charles VI was indeed ultimately succeeded by his own firstborn child Maria Theresa, who was born four years after the signing of the Sanction. However, despite the promulgation of the Pragmatic Sanction, her accession in 1740 resulted in the outbreak of the War of the Austrian Succession as Charles Albert of Bavaria, backed by France, contested her inheritance. After the war, Maria Theresa's inheritance of the Habsburg lands was confirmed by the Treaty of Aix-la-Chapelle, and the election of her husband, Francis I, as Holy Roman Emperor was secured by the Treaty of Füssen.

== Background ==
In 1700, the senior Spanish branch of the House of Habsburg became extinct with the death of Charles II of Spain. The War of the Spanish Succession ensued, with Louis XIV of France claiming the crowns of Spain for his grandson Philip, and Holy Roman Emperor Leopold I claiming them for his son Charles. In 1703, Charles and Joseph, Leopold's sons, signed the Mutual Pact of Succession, granting succession rights to the daughters of Joseph and Charles in the case of complete extinction of the male line but favoring the daughters of Joseph over those of Charles, as Joseph was older.

In 1705, Leopold I died and was succeeded by his elder son, Joseph I. Six years later, Joseph I died leaving behind two daughters, Archduchesses Maria Josepha and Maria Amalia. Charles succeeded Joseph, according to the Pact, and Maria Josepha became his heiress presumptive.

However, Charles decided to amend the Pact to give his own future daughters precedence over his nieces. On 19 April 1713, he announced the changes in a secret session of the council.

Securing the right to succeed for his own daughters, who were not even born yet, became Charles's obsession. The previous succession laws had also forbidden the partition of the Habsburg dominions and provided for succession by females, but that had been mostly hypothetical. The Pragmatic Sanction was the first such document to be publicly announced and so required formal acceptance by the estates of the realms affected.

== Foreign recognition ==
For 10 years, Charles VI labored, with the support of his closest advisor, Johann Christoph von Bartenstein, to have his sanction accepted by the courts of Europe. Only the Electorate of Saxony and the Electorate of Bavaria did not accept it because it was detrimental to their inheritance rights as their sovereigns were married to the daughters of Emperor Joseph I: Frederick Augustus II, Elector of Saxony was married to Maria Josepha and Charles Albert, Elector of Bavaria to Maria Amalia.

- France accepted in exchange for the Duchy of Lorraine, under the Treaty of Vienna.
- Spain's acceptance was also gained under the Treaty of Vienna. In 1731, the 15-year-old Spanish prince Charles became the Duke of Parma and Piacenza, as Charles I, on the death of his childless granduncle Antonio Farnese. He went on to conquer Naples and Sicily, after which he returned Parma to the Emperor by the Treaty of Vienna. In 1759, he became King of Spain as Charles III.
- Great Britain and the Dutch Republic accepted in exchange for the cessation of operations of the Ostend Company.
- King Frederick William I of Prussia approved out of loyalty to the Emperor.

Charles VI made commitments with Russia and Augustus of Saxony, King of Poland, which caused two wars: the War of the Polish Succession against France and Spain, which cost him Naples and Sicily, and the Austro-Turkish War, which cost him Little Wallachia and northern Serbia, including Belgrade Fortress.

== Internal recognition ==
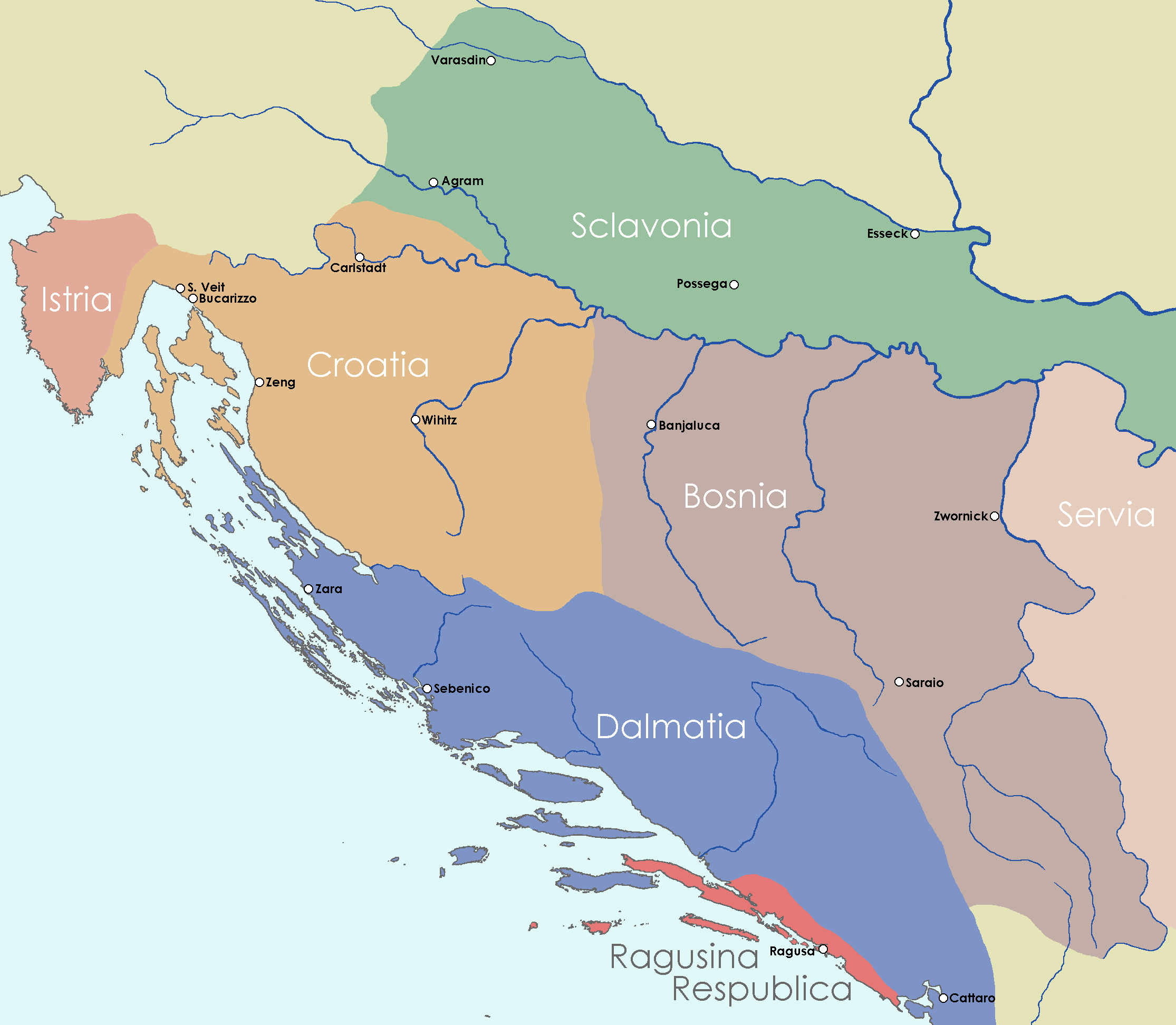
The Kingdom of Croatia and other crown lands, Republic of Ragusa and Serbia at the time of the Pragmatic Sanction

Hungary, which had an elective kingship, had accepted the House of Habsburg as hereditary kings in the male line without election in 1687 but not semi-Salic inheritance. The Emperor-King agreed that if the Habsburg male line became extinct, Hungary would once again have an elective monarchy; the same was the rule in the Kingdom of Bohemia.

Maria Theresa, however, still gained the throne of Hungary. The Diet of Hungary voted its own Pragmatic Sanction of 1723 in which the Kingdom of Hungary accepted female inheritance supporting her to become queen of Hungary.

Kingdom of Croatia was one of the crown lands that supported Emperor Charles's Pragmatic Sanction of 1713 and supported Empress Maria Theresa in the War of the Austrian Succession of 1741–48 and the Croatian Sabor (parliament) signed their own Pragmatic Sanction of 1712. Subsequently, the empress made significant contributions to Croatian matters by making several changes in the administrative control of the Military Frontier, the feudal and tax system. She also gave the independent port of Rijeka to Croatia in 1776.

== See also ==
- Pragmatic Sanction of 1830

== Bibliography ==
- Crankshaw, Edward: Maria Theresa, Longman publishers 1969
- Holborn, Hajo: A History of Modern Germany: 1648–1840, Princeton University Press 1982 ISBN 0-691-00796-9
- Ingrao, Charles W: The Habsburg monarchy, 1618–1815, Cambridge University Press 2000 ISBN 0-521-78505-7
- Kann, Robert A.: A history of the Habsburg Empire, 1526–1918, University of California Press. 1980 ISBN 0-520-04206-9
- Mahan, J. Alexander: Maria Theresa of Austria, Read Books. 2007 ISBN 1-4067-3370-9
