= Novosel family =

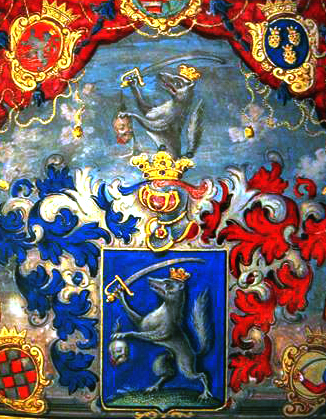
Novosel family coat of Arms

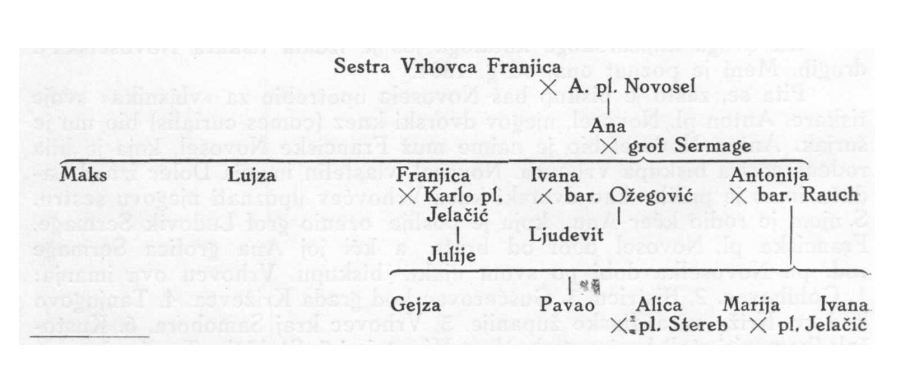
Last male member of the Novosel family and their female successors

The Novosel family was a Croatian noble family, influential in the Kingdom of Croatia and in the later Habsburg monarchy during the period in history marked by the Ottoman wars in Europe. Luka Novosel was awarded a title of nobility in 1744 for his command of the Kostajnica fortress against the Ottomans by Empress Maria Theresa. He also held the functions of Vice Prefect (Požega County and Zagreb County), member of the Royal Court (Latin judicium delegatum) and member of the Royal Commission for suppressing revolt. Other famous members include Antun Novosel, who ran the bishopric printing office in Zagreb and held the function of Head of the Bishopric Palace (Comes Curialis).

In the 15th century the Novosels settled below Medvednica. The Novosels were highly represented in the battles against the Turks, as evidenced by the coat of arms of the family, which represents a wolf holding a severed Ottoman head.

== History ==
The Novosels were given nobility status on 12 September 1744 under Empress Maria Theresa. The muniment of nobility and the coat of arms confirmed Luka Novosel as a noble of the Kingdom of Croatia and Slavonia, which was part of Transleithania, as Vice Captain of the fortress at Hrvatska Kostajnica for the military merits of his fighting against the Ottoman Turks. Luka Novosel was elected deputy prefect of Požega County on 12 November 1750; on 8 April 1755 Empress Maria Theresa appointed him a member of the Commission and a member of the Royal Court (judicium delegatum) in suppressing revolts in Virovitica County. The session of the Commission and the Court started on 21 May 1755.

Empress Maria Theresa appointed Count Joseph Keglević the president of the Commission and Royal Court, and as members of the Commission and Court she appointed General Count Serbellonia, the advisors of Ignat Kemfa, and the deputy prefect of Požega County, Luka Novosel. The Chairman of the Commission soon came to the conclusion that the sources of rebellion in the entire County of Virovitica were the serfs from Bukovica and "five villages of the upper Alexandar Pejačević" on the Virovitica estate. On 14 June 1755 the Commission was ordered to capture the ringleaders of the revolt in these six villages. Antun Novosel, son of Luka Novosel, was appointed the function of Head of the Bishopric Palace (Comes Curialis) by Bishop Maximilian Vrhovac de Rakitovec and also married the bishop’s sister Francisca. Emperor Joseph II ordered Bishop Maximilian to give his printing office and bookstore to someone else, so the bishop give them to the Antun Novosel. In 1796 the Novosel printing office printed the book Robinson Crusoe translated into Croatian. This was first edition of this book translated into Croatian in Croatia and the wider world. Anthony Novosel was the proprietor of Dolec near Laduc in the Susedgrad seigniory. He died 27 April 1800. The printing office and the book store after the death of Antun Novosel were operated by his widow until 1825, when the Bishop sold it to Rossij. Franjica Novosel, the wife of Antun Novosel and sister of Bishop Vrhovec, died in 1826. Antun and Franjica only had a daughter, Ana, who married count Ludovik Sermage. With her death ended the line of the Novosel family.
