= Novoselov =

Novoselov or Novosyolov (masculine, Russian: Новосёлов), Novoselova Novosyolova (feminine, Russian: Новосёлова) is a Russian surname. Notable people with the surname include:

- Andrei Novoselov (born 1989), Russian pair skater
- Evgenii Novoselov (born 1989), Russian diver
- Konstantin Novoselov (born 1974), Russian-British physicist
- Masha Novoselova (born 1985), Russian fashion model
- Mikhail Novosyolov, Soviet-Tajik serial killer
- Vadim Novoselov (born 1987), Russian badminton player
