= Franić =

Franić is a surname. Notable people with the surname include:

- Borna Franić (born 1975), Croatian handball player
- Darko Franić (born 1987), Croatian footballer
- Domagoj Franić (born 1993), Croatian footballer
- Frane Franić (1912–2007), Croatian Roman Catholic archbishop
- Ivan Franić (born 1994), Croatian Australian engineer

== See also ==
- Frane
