= Bajnski Dvori Castle =

Castle in Hrvatsko Zagorje, Croatia

Coordinates: 46°18′31″N 16°09′15″E

Coat of arms of the Both de Bayna family, which founded Bajnski Dvori Castle

Bajnski Dvori Castle is a castle in the Gornje Ladanje village, Vinica municipality, Varaždin County, Northern Croatia.

Located in the surrounding park, near a small lake and a chapel, the castle represents a valuable example of architectural skill and historical heritage. It was founded in the 17th century by the members of Both of Bayna, a noble family of Hungarian ancestry, who gave two Bans of Croatia, John (Croatian: Ivan) in 1493 and Andrew (Croatian: Andrija) in 1505–1507. Later it was owned by the members of the families Batthyány, Erdödy and Feštetić.

In the 19th century the castle was enlarged and renewed in the spirit of historicism, but in the turbulent times of the First world war it was set on fire and partially ruined. Many works of art, books, furniture and other precious things of high value were destroyed. Until today, only the eastern wing of the castle remained. After the Second world war, until the beginning of this century, there were departments and medical facilities of Varaždin Medical centre there.

Today the castle and surroundings are weathered and long for renewal.

== Gallery ==
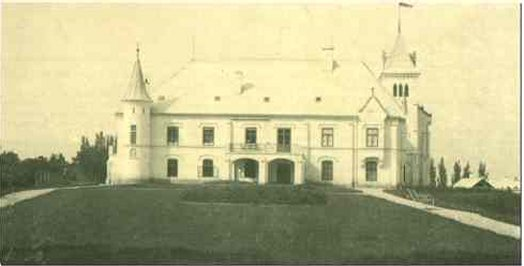
A photo from 1913

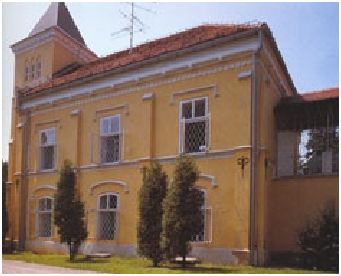
A recent photo
