= Kružić =

Kružić is a Croatian surname, the root of which is the word krug, lit. 'circle'. Notable people with the surname include:

- Marin Kružić (born 1989), Croatian handball player
- Petar Kružić (1491–1537), Croatian knez, captain, soldier and defender of Klis
