= Ugrinić =

Ugrinić is a surname. Notable people with the surname include:

- Filip Ugrinic (born 1999), Swiss footballer
- Veljko Ugrinić (1885–1958), Croatian football manager
- Ugrinić family, a medieval Croatian noble family
