= Luka Kraljević =

Slovenian basketball player

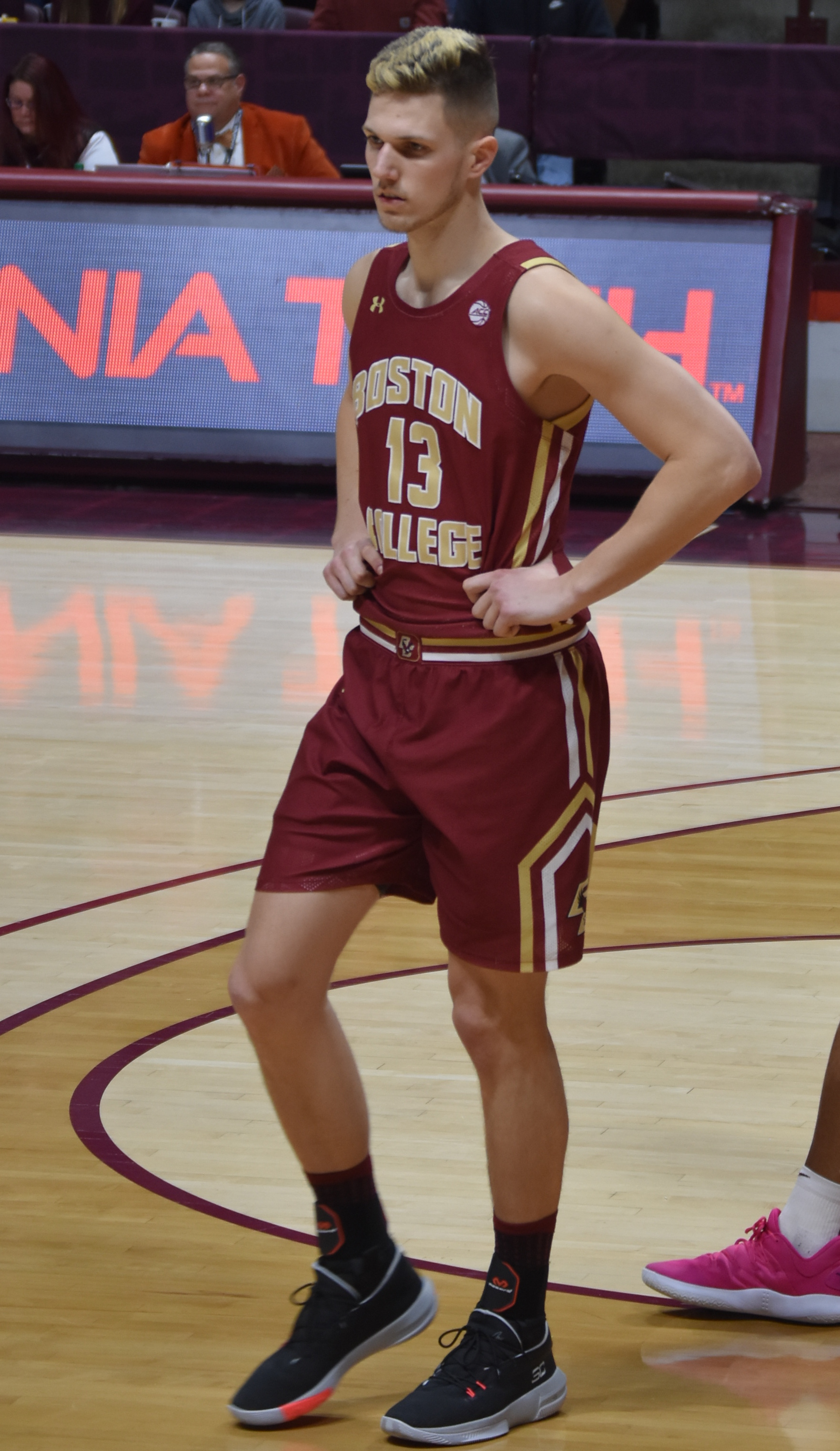

No. 13 – KK Rogaška
- Position: Power forward / center
- League: Slovenian League

Personal information
- Born: December 4, 1997 (age 28) Ljubljana, Slovenia
- Listed height: 2.08 m (6 ft 10 in)
- Listed weight: 103.5 kg (228 lb)

Career information
- High school: Don Bosco Prep (Ramsey, New Jersey)
- College: Boston College (2017–2021)
- NBA draft: 2021: undrafted
- Playing career: 2014–present

Career history
- 2012–2013: Union Olimpija
- 2013–2015: Helios Suns
- 2015–2016: Jolly Jadranska Banka
- 2021–2022: Nutrispoint Ilirija
- 2022–present: KK Rogaška

Luka Kraljević (born December 4, 1997) is a Slovenian basketball player for KK Rogaška of the Slovenian League. He previously competed for KK Jolly Jadranska Banka of the Croatian League. Standing at 2.08 m (6 ft 10 in), he plays the power forward and center positions. He played college basketball for the Boston College Eagles. He also in his youth played football in ONK Metković.

== Career statistics ==
Legend
GP	Games played	GS	Games started	MPG	Minutes per game
FG%	Field goal percentage	3P%	3-point field goal percentage	FT%	Free throw percentage
RPG	Rebounds per game	APG	Assists per game	SPG	Steals per game
BPG	Blocks per game	PPG	Points per game	**Bold**	Career high

=== College ===
Year	Team	GP	GS	MPG	FG%	3P%	FT%	RPG	APG	SPG	BPG	PPG
2017–18	Boston College	**31**	**1**	**9.4**	.357	.231	.500	**1.5**	**.5**	**.2**	**.5**	**1.5**
2018–19	Boston College	22	**1**	6.0	.385	.000	**.571**	1.2	.4	**.2**	.2	1.1
2019–20	Boston College	22	**1**	6.4	**.533**	**.500**	.500	.9	.3	.0	.1	.9
2020–21	Boston College	3	0	4.0	.250	.333	–	.3	.3	.0	.3	1.0
Career		78	3	7.4	.391	.250	.514	1.2	.4	.2	.3	1.2

== Personal life ==
His father is a policeman Jurica Kraljević. His mother is Neđa Kraljević.
