= Ratkaj =

Surname

Ratkaj (also archaically spelled Rattkay) is a Croatian surname. People bearing this surname include:

- Ivan Ratkaj (1647–1683), Jesuit missionary and explorer
- Juraj Ratkaj (1612–1666), Jesuit historian and canon of Zagreb
