= János Delišimunović =

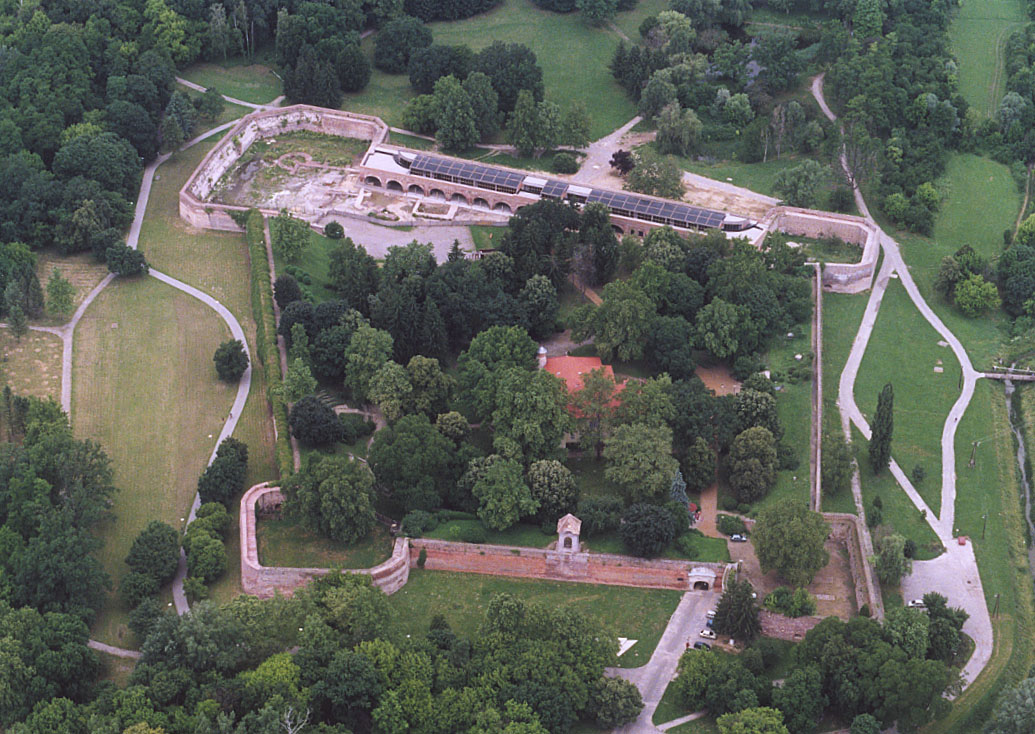
Szigetvár castle today

János Delišimunović (also spelled János Delisimonovich) was a 17th century local official, militia commander and member of the Delišimunović family who moved to Pécs, Hungary in 1685. He is recorded as a judge in Pécs and is noted for his role in the reconquest of Szigetvár in 1689, where he served as captain of the Pécs soldiers.

== Military career ==
According to the "Inquisitiones Commissionis Regiae" (Royal Commission Inquisition Records) of 1747, testimony from a local witness named József Katies recalled that during the final expulsion of the Turks from Hungary, “under the command of Captain Delišimunović from this town, the burghers of Pécs went to assist at the siege of Szigetvár.” This record identifies Delišimunović as the captain of the Pécs militia during the 1689 siege of Szigetvár, an event which restored the fortress to Habsburg control.

== Civic career ==
Delišimunović remained active in the administration of Pécs after the reconquest of Szigetvar. He later appeared in county assembly records as a county judge. In 1693, he was made the district judge for Mohács.

According to Gattermann, Delišimunović and his family were among the South Slavic newcomers who settled in Pécs around 1686, integrating into the emerging local elite following the Ottoman withdrawal. He married Anna Pávics, the daughter of an old local family from Pécs, thereby linking the newly arrived officials with the established burgher class.

Gattermann’s study also records Delišimunović as holding multiple civic offices in Pécs between 1693 and 1704, including tax collector and sworn assessor. He is further listed among land tenants in the Hofkammer’s lease registers, holding the estates of Belvárd and Birján under contract.
