= Mike Belosevic =

Canadian immunologist

Miodrag "Mike" Belosevic, FRSC is a professor of immunology in the University of Alberta Department of Biological Sciences. In 2008, he was elected as a fellow of the Royal Society of Canada.
