= Pragmatic Sanction of 1712 =

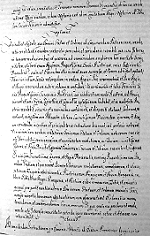
The text of the Pragmatic Sanction of 1712

The Article 7 of the Sabor of 1712, better known as the Pragmatic Sanction of 1712 or the Croatian Pragmatic Sanction (Croatian: Hrvatska pragmatička sankcija), was a decision of the Croatian Parliament (Sabor) to accept that a Habsburg princess could become hereditary Queen of Croatia. It was passed against the will of the Diet of Hungary, despite the Kingdom of Croatia's centuries-long association with the Kingdom of Hungary. The resulting strife with the Hungarian officials ended with the legal recognition of the Croatian Parliament's sole jurisdiction over internal Croatian affairs. The Pragmatic Sanction is thus considered one of the most historically important decisions of the Croatian Parliament, and is recalled in the preamble of the Constitution of Croatia.

== Succession issue ==
Succession issues appeared on the accession of the childless King Charles III (also Holy Roman Emperor as Charles VI), the last male Habsburg, in 1711. Charles had privately agreed with his older brother and predecessor, King Joseph I, on the Mutual Pact of Succession in 1703. The Mutual Pact provided for female succession in the event of extinction of the male line, but gave precedence to the daughters of the older rather than surviving brother. Charles wished to secure his hereditary realms for his own daughter, should he have any.

The first step towards fulfilling Charles's wish, which would become a life-long obsession, was taken in the Kingdom of Croatia. Imre Esterházy, Bishop of Zagreb, presiding at the parliamentary session on 9 March 1712, proposed approving the King's wish beforehand. The estates of the realm agreed on 11 March that the Kingdom of Croatia should be ruled in future by whichever member of the Habsburg dynasty, male or female, reigned over the Archduchy of Austria, the Duchy of Styria and the Duchy of Carinthia.

== Dispute ==
On 15 March, the estates offered to accept the King's proposed succession settlement regardless of the proceedings of the Diet of Hungary. This was controversial. Croatia had been united with the Kingdom of Hungary since 1102, but the Hungarians were not as loyal to the Habsburgs as the Croatians and now wished to reassert their right to elect kings. Croatia and Hungary shared some royal offices, and Croatian deputies attended the sessions of the Diet of Hungary. For that reason the Hungarian estates claimed that the Croatian Parliament was not competent to independently deliberate on the matters of succession and that its Pragmatic Sanction was not legally binding. The Croatian Parliament did, however, possess "autonomous statute-making power", receiving royal assent without reference to the Diet of Hungary. The Croatians maintained that Croatia was subject to the Holy Crown of Hungary, personified by the King of Hungary, rather than to the Kingdom of Hungary.

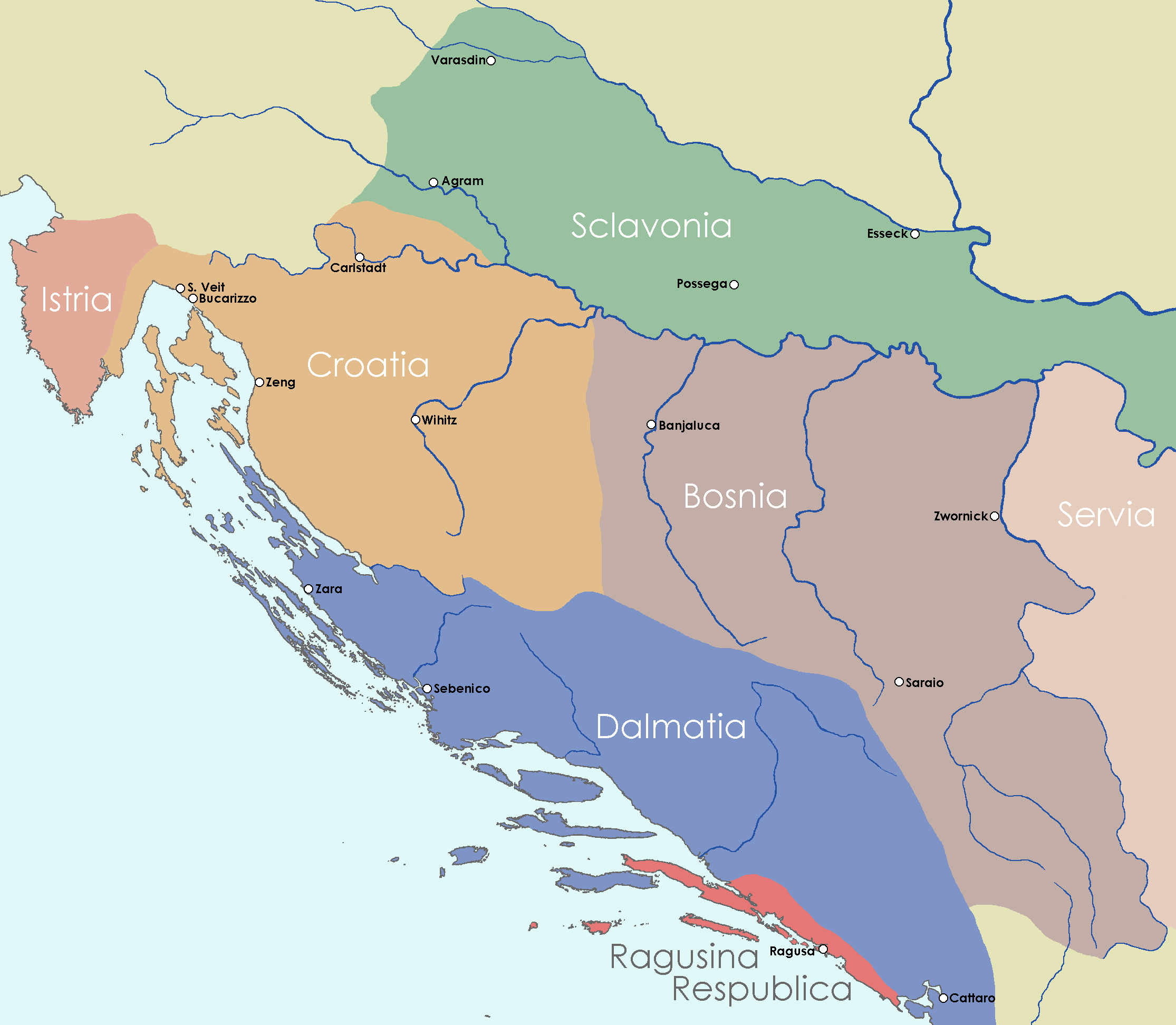
Croatian lands in 1720 according to the map of the German cartographer Matthäus Seutter

Aware of the dispute, Charles was not overly enthusiastic about the support shown to him by the Croatian estates. He decided to focus on securing Hungarian approval instead, and tried to please both sides in the strife over competence. The Croatian Parliament approved the King's intention a full year before he made it official by issuing the Pragmatic Sanction of 1713. Charles's device stipulated that his daughters, if any, should precede his brother's in the line of succession and that the entire Habsburg monarchy should pass intact to his heir.

Hungary continued to object to Charles's Pragmatic Sanction. He had to confirm in 1715 the Hungarian nobility's right to elect a king if he failed to father a son. Charles, however, personally ensured at the same time that the Diet of Hungary, despite contribution from Croatian deputies, would not have jurisdiction over internal affairs of Croatia. The Kingdom of Croatia and the Principality of Transylvania, both "separately administered" lands of the Hungarian Crown, declared support for the King's device in 1721 and 1722 respectively. The Hungarians finally gave their approval in the form of the Pragmatic Sanction of 1723, which again emphasized Croatia's link to Hungary.

== Legacy ==
The legal recognition of the competence of the Croatian Parliament following its declaration of the Pragmatic Sanction of 1712 improved Croatia's standing in relation to Hungary and the rest of the Habsburg Monarchy. Furthermore, the ramifications of the Pragmatic Sanctions are considered an historical foundation of the modern Republic of Croatia. The "autonomous and sovereign decision of the Croatian Sabor to sign the Pragmatic Sanction of 1712" is thus evoked in the preamble of the Constitution of Croatia as a manifestation of the "millennial national identity of the Croatian nation and the continuity of its statehood".

== See also ==
- 1527 election in Cetin – decision of the Croatian Parliament to enthrone the Habsburgs
- Maria Theresa – daughter and successor of Charles III in Hungary, Croatia, Austria, etc.
- War of the Austrian Succession – armed conflict over the implementation of the Pragmatic Sanction

== Bibliography ==
- Ingrao, Charles W. (2000). The Habsburg Monarchy, 1618–1815. Cambridge University Press. ISBN 1107268699.
- International Institute for Democracy, ed. (1996). The Rebirth of Democracy: 12 Constitutions of Central and Eastern Europe. Council of Europe. ISBN 9287130949.
- Goldstein, Ivo (1999). Croatia: A History. McGill-Queen's Press. ISBN 0773520171.
- Péter, László (2012). Lojkó, Miklós (ed.). Hungary's Long Nineteenth Century: Constitutional and Democratic Traditions in a European Perspective. BRILL. ISBN 900422212X.
- Sugar, Peter F. (1994). A History of Hungary. Indiana University Press. ISBN 025320867X.
