= Mutual Pact of Succession =

1703 pact in the Holy Roman Empire

The Mutual Pact of Succession (Latin: Pactum Mutuae Successionis, German: Gegenseitiger Erbvertrag) was a succession device secretly signed by archdukes Joseph and Charles of Austria, brothers and future emperors of the Holy Roman Empire, in 1703.

In 1700 the senior line of the House of Habsburg became extinct with the death of King Charles II of Spain. The War of the Spanish Succession ensued, with Louis XIV of France claiming the crowns of Spain for his grandson Philip and Holy Roman Emperor Leopold I claiming them for his son Archduke Charles. The Pact was devised by Emperor Leopold I, on the occasion of Charles's departure for Spain. It stipulated that the claim to the Spanish realms was to be assumed by Charles, while the right of succession to the rest of the Habsburg dominions would rest with his elder brother Joseph, thereby again dividing the House of Habsburg into two lines. The Pact also specified the succession to the brothers: they would both be succeeded by their respective male heirs but should one of them fail to have a son, the other one would succeed him in all his realms. However, should both brothers die leaving no sons, the daughters of the elder brother (Joseph) would have absolute precedence over the daughters of the younger brother (Charles) and the eldest daughter of Joseph would ascend all the Habsburg thrones.

In 1705 Leopold I died and was succeeded by his elder son, Joseph I. Six years later, Emperor Joseph I died leaving behind two daughters, Archduchesses Maria Josepha and Maria Amalia. Charles, who was at the time still unsuccessfully fighting for the crowns of Spain, succeeded him according to the Pact and returned to Vienna. According to the Pact, the heir presumptive to the Habsburg realms was, at that moment, Charles's niece, Maria Josepha, who was followed in the line of succession by her younger sister, Maria Amalia. However, Charles soon expressed a wish to amend the Pact in order to give his own future daughters precedence over his nieces. On 9 April 1713, the Emperor announced the changes in a secret session of the council.

The Pact was finally superseded by the Pragmatic Sanction of 1713, promulgated by Charles to ensure the succession of his own daughters instead of Joseph's. The crowns belonging to the House of Habsburg were thus inherited by Charles's elder surviving daughter, Maria Theresa (born in 1717), rather than by Joseph's elder daughter, Maria Josepha.

== Bibliography ==
- Crankshaw, Edward: Maria Theresa, Longman publishers 1969
- Holborn, Hajo: A History of Modern Germany: 1648–1840 Princeton University Press 1982 ISBN 0-691-00796-9
- Ingrao, Charles W: The Habsburg monarchy, 1618–1815 Cambridge University Press 2000 ISBN 0-521-78505-7
- Kann, Robert A.: A history of the Habsburg Empire, 1526–1918 University of California Press 1980 ISBN 0-520-04206-9
- Mahan, J. Alexander: Maria Theresa of Austria READ BOOKS 2007 ISBN 1-4067-3370-9
