= Charles Ingrao =

American historian of Europe (born 1948)

Charles W. Ingrao (born 1948) is an American historian and public intellectual focused on early modern Central Europe and the contemporary Balkans. Born and raised in New York City, he attended Richmond Hill High School. He received his BA from Wesleyan in 1969 and his PhD from Brown in 1974, studying under Norman Rich and William F. Church. He is a professor of history at Purdue University and has held visiting positions around the world. In 2001, he founded and still directs “The Scholars' Initiative." This project seeks to use the work of scholars to undermine nationalist interpretations of the recent past that have made peace in the Balkans difficult. As of 2011, the project had brought together over 300 scholars from 30 nations, including all of the states of the former Yugoslavia.

== Background ==
Ingrao was born on March 15, 1948. He is an authority of the early modern period in Germany and Central Europe, publishing numerous books and scholarly articles on various political, economic, and cultural topics. He has served as editor of the Austrian History Yearbook (1997-2006) is Founding Editor of Purdue University Press's “Central European Studies” series (1997 to the present). In October 1991, he founded HABSBURG, "the first Internet discussion group dedicated to an historical theme." He has been the recipient of numerous grants and fellowships including three Fulbright awards, NEH grants, and an Alexander von Humboldt Foundation Fellowship. In 2015, he was awarded the “Discovery Excellence Award for the Humanities” from Purdue University.

Although Ingrao initially published on the early modern history of the Habsburg monarchy and the Holy Roman Empire, he refocused his scholarship to ethnic coexistence and conflict during the Yugoslav Wars in the 1990s. Shortly after the Srebrenica massacre, he made the first of over fifty trips to the Balkan war zones to heighten public awareness of the contrast between region's history of ethnic coexistence and the humanitarian catastrophe wrought by ethnic nationalism. In 1996, he uncovered evidence of the Clinton administration's duplicity in shielding war criminals from arrest that was reported by NPR and the New York Times. This brought him into the public debate and intra-governmental struggle over US policy. By the late 1990s, he was a regular interview subject for print, radio and television news stories in Europe and North America, as well as a recurring guest on PBS's NewsHour with Jim Lehrer. His focus on the interplay of history and contemporary policymaking led to a series of nationally and internationally syndicated columns and guest lectures across North America, Europe and China before academic, governmental and military audiences, including the US State Department, several US Embassies abroad, the US Capitol, the British House of Commons, S.H.A.P.E. headquarters, and the National Defense University.

== The Scholars' Initiative ==
He also helped develop “The Scholars' Initiative: Confronting the Yugoslav Controversies,” which brought both regional and international scholars together to examine the origins and course of the conflict in order to dispel myths and half-truths that disrupt dialogue and reconciliation. Over the next eight years eleven multinational research teams published four volumes. With the appearance of Confronting the Yugoslav Controversies in 2009, the project presented the first common narrative of the conflict intended to serve as the basis for mutual understanding and political moderation. The group's efforts have garnered considerable media attention both in the region and abroad, including strident criticism from the nationalist circles in Bosnia, Croatia, and Serbia, as well as from former Ambassador Richard Holbrooke after exposing the Clinton Administration's role in shielding Serbian wartime leader Radovan Karadžić from arrest.

== Books ==
In Quest and Crisis: Emperor Joseph I and the Habsburg Monarchy (West Lafayette, IN: Purdue University Press, 1979). Expanded German edition: Josef I. Der “vergessene” Kaiser (Vienna, Graz and Cologne: Styria Verlag, 1982).

The Hessian Mercenary State: Ideas, Institutions, and Reform under Frederick II, 1760-1785 (Cambridge: Cambridge University Press, 1987).

ed., State & Society in Early Modern Austria (W. Lafayette, IN: Purdue University Press, 1994).

The Habsburg Monarchy 1618-1815 (Cambridge: Cambridge University Press, 1994; 2nd edition, 2000; 3rd edition, 2019). Expanded Serbian edition: Habzburška monarhija 1618-1815 (Belgrade: Republika, 2014).

with Lazar Vrkatić, Nenaučena Lekcija: srednjoeuropska ideja I srpski nacionalni program (Untaught Lessons: the Central European Idea and the Serbian National Program) (Belgrade: International Helsinki Federation for Human Rights, 2001).

with Thomas Emmert, "Resolving the Yugoslav Controversies: a Scholars’ Initiative," [Nationalities Papers, 32/4 (2004)]. Republished as Conflict in Southeastern Europe at the End of the Twentieth Century: a Scholars’ Initiative (New York & London: Routledge, 2006).

ed. with Franz Szabo, The Germans and the East (W. Lafayette, IN: Purdue University Press, 2007).

with Thomas Emmert, Confronting the Yugoslav Controversies: a Scholars’ Initiative (West Lafayette: Purdue University Press and U.S. Institute of Peace Press, 2009, revised/expanded 2nd ed. 2012). Revised BCS edition: Suočavanje s jugoslovenskim kontroverzama (Sarajevo: Buy Book, 2010.). Updated and expanded Montenegrin edition (Podgorica: University of Podgorica Press, 2015).

with Nikola Samardžić and Jovan Pešalj, The Peace of Passarowitz, 1718 (West Lafayette, IN: Purdue University Press, 2011).

== Selected articles ==
- “‘Barbarous Strangers': Hessian State and Society during the American Revolution,” The American Historical Review 87 (1982), 954-76.
- “The Problem of Enlightened Absolutism and the German States,” The Journal of Modern History, 58 (1986), S161-80. Reprinted in: The Enlightenment: Critical Concepts in Historical Studies (New York: Routledge, 2009)
- “Paul W. Schroeder's Balance of Power: Stability or Anarchy?,” The International History Review, Vol 16, No. 4 (November 1994), 681-700.
- “Understanding Ethnic Conflict in Central Europe: an Historical Perspective,” Nationalities Papers, 27:June 1999), 291-318, 331-32. Expanded Serbian edition: “Deset nenau enih lekcija o Srednjoj Evropi - pogled istori ara,” in Charles Ingrao and Lazar Vrkatić, Nenaučena Lekcija: srednjoeuropska ideja I srpski nacionalni program (International Helsinki Federation for Human Rights - Belgrade, 2001), 7-36.
- “Weapons of Mass Instruction: Schoolbooks and Democratization in Central Europe,” Contexts: the Journal of Educational Media, Memory, and Society (New York & Oxford: Berghahn 2008), 199-209
- “Reconstructing History in the Former Yugoslavia: the Scholars’ Initiative,” The American Historical Review 114 (2009), 947-962.
- “Challenges to Democracy in Montenegro,” US Department of State website blogs.america.gov/bythepeople/2009/10/29.
