= Turanj, Karlovac =

Coordinates: 45°27′36″N 15°34′26″E

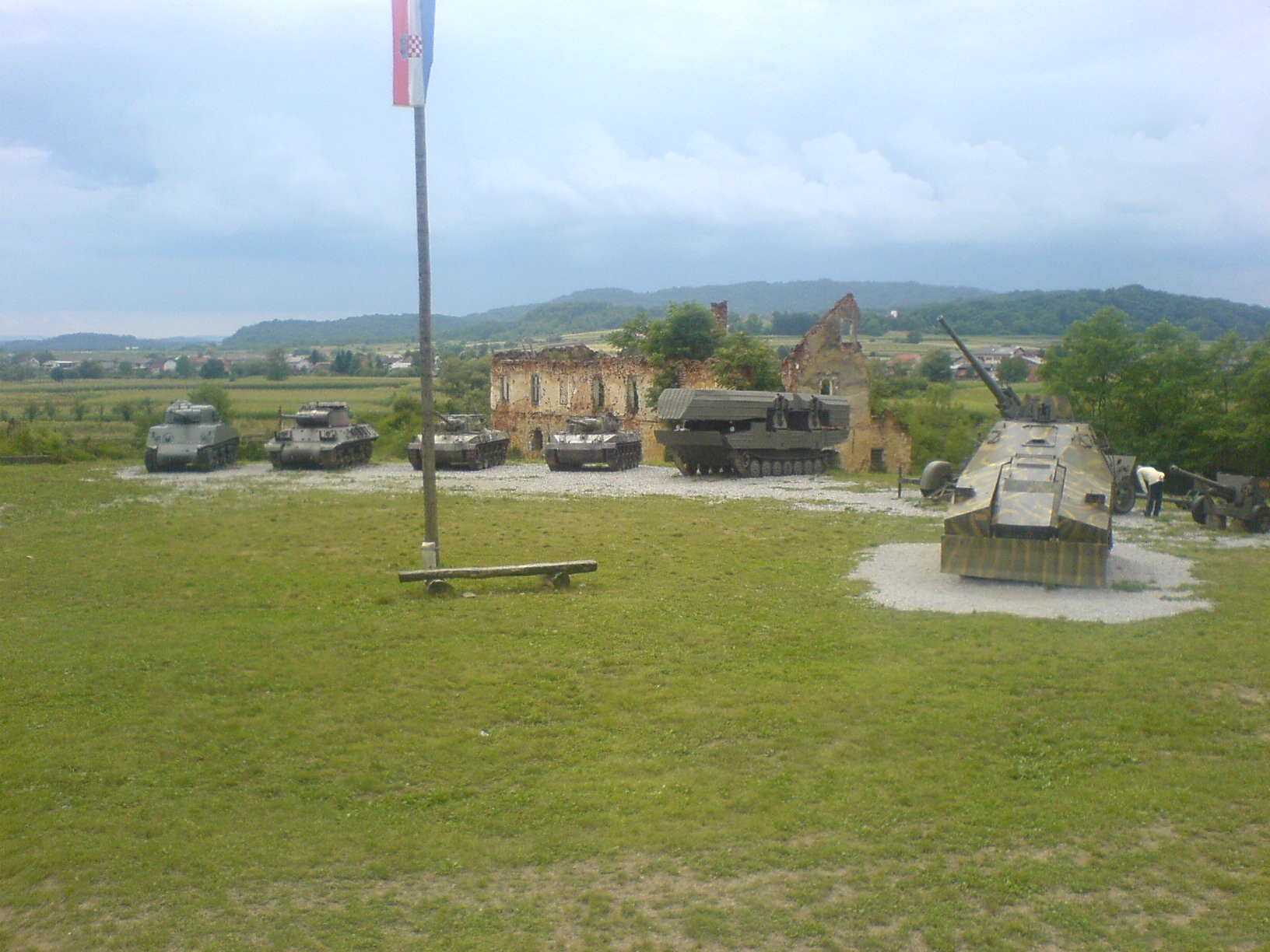
Museum of the Croatian War of Independence

Turanj is one of the suburbs of the city of Karlovac, Croatia, with a population of 2,615. It is located in the south of the city, separated from the rest by the rivers Mrežnica and Korana. The D1 highway passes through Turanj.

== History ==
For the fortification of Ivanić in 1598, Turanj and Oršića Grad had to supply 4 carts.
