= Pokuplje =

Name for the Kupa river basin in Croatia

Coordinates: 45°28′56″N 15°48′43″E

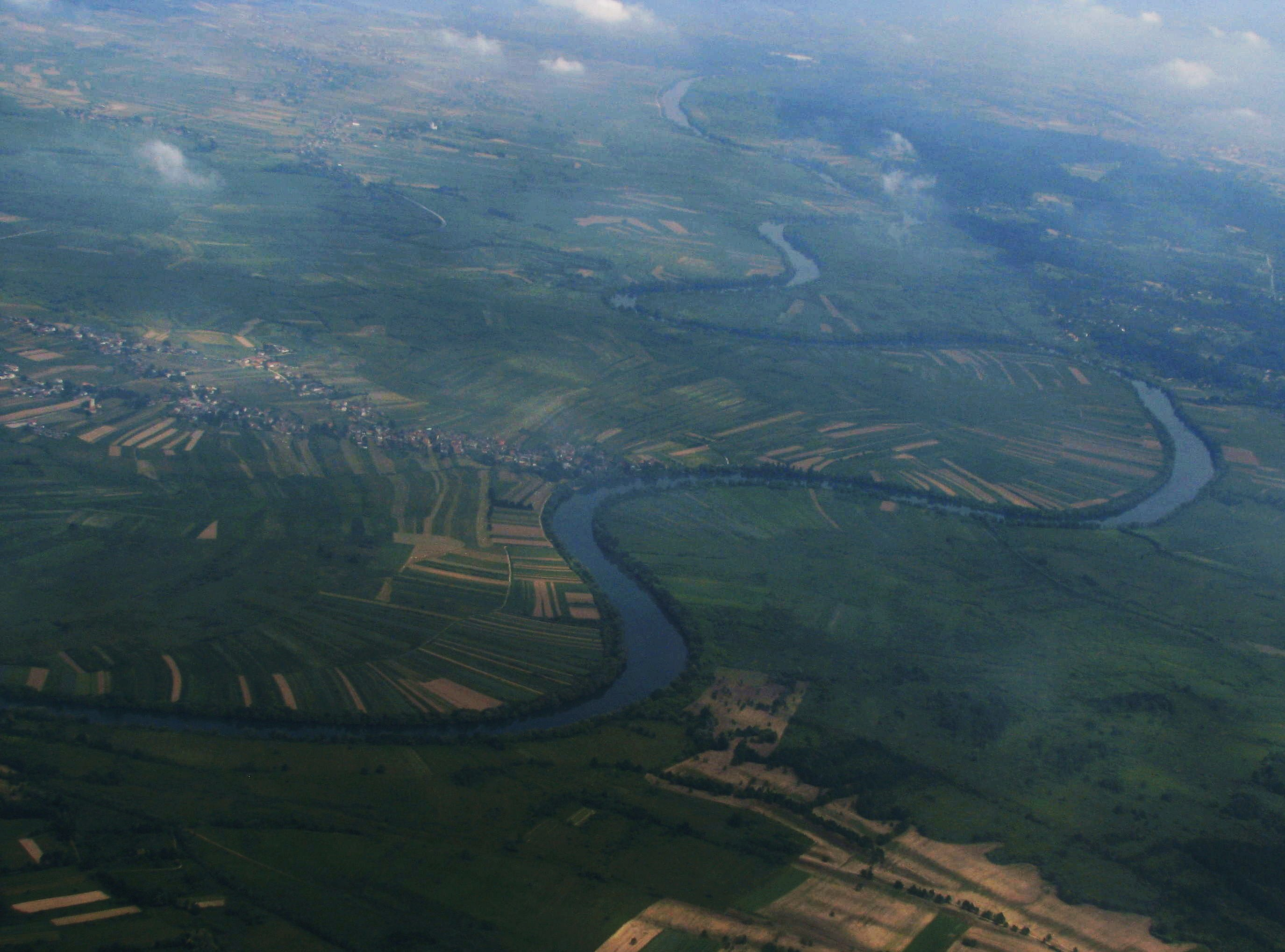
View of the Kupa River from above

Pokuplje is the name for the Kupa river basin in Croatia. Major settlements are Karlovac, Sisak, Petrinja, Glina and Topusko.

== Sources ==
- Pokuplje at enciklopedija.hr (in Croatian)
