= Ragusan nobility =

Aristocratic families of the Republic of Ragusa

The nobility of the Republic of Ragusa included patrician families, most of which originated from the City of Dubrovnik, and some coming from other, mostly neighbouring, countries.

The Republic of Ragusa was ruled by a strict patriciate formally established in 1332, which was subsequently modified only once, following the 1667 Dubrovnik earthquake.

== Families ==
- Basiljević
- Benessa
- Binciola
- Bobali
- Bocignolo
- Bodazza
- Bona
- Bonda
- Božidarević
- Buća
- Cerva
- Giorgi
- Ghetaldi
- Gradić
- Gučetić
- Gundulić
- Kaboga
- Calich
- Klašić
- Crasso
- Croce
- Giuriceo
- Gleda
- Lukarić
- Martinussio
- Menčetić
- Mlaschagna
- Natali
- Palmotić
- Pavlić
- Proculi
- Prodanelli
- Pucić
- Radagli
- Ranjina
- Resti
- Saraca
- Sorgo
- Tudisi
- Vodopić
- Volcasso
- Zamagna
- Zlatarić

== See also ==
- Patrician (post-Roman Europe)
