= Bonda family =

Noble family

(de) Bonda Bondić
- Country: Republic of Ragusa
- Founded: 13th century
- Dissolution: 19th century

The House of Bonda or Bondić was a Ragusan noble family and as such belonged to the Ragusan nobility. A cadet branch became Austrian nobility in 1857.

== History ==
The Bonda were first mentioned in 1190; 836 years ago. The progenitor was "Petragne de Bonda". By the beginning of the 15th century the family had notably decreased in size.

In the beginning of the 15th century Ragusan nobility were present in Novo Brdo as merchants or mining lords; Bonda were also present.

After 1808, with the French occupation and division of the Ragusan nobility into two groups, the family joined the Salamancanists, along with the Bassegli, Benessa, Buća, Giorgi, Bona, Gradi, Ragnina, Resti and Tudisi, while Gondola, Palmotta, Proculo were Sorbonnists; the rest of Ragusan nobility had branches, more or less, in both groups. In 1754 one branch of the Bona family were granted titles in Poland.

== Bondić family (Austrian) ==
The Austrian Empire granted the title of Count to Bondić family on 26 January 1857. The family expired with the last descendant of the Bondić family (through the female line), famous poet and translator Ignjat Đurđević.

- Orsat Bondić (21 August 1812 – 2 December 1874), married Marija Božidarević (Dubrovnik, 13 June 1815 – 13 October 1902, Dubrovnik), they had three children:
  - Marin Orsat Luko Antun Bondić (9 January 1840 – 24 March 1902) married Maria Helene von Romaszka in Lemberg on 1 February 1877 They had two daughters:
    - Marie-Josephine Antonia Henriette Bondić (28 September 1878–?), married Anton Ritter Tarnawa von Malczewski
    - Marija-Malvina Juliana Wanda Bondić (10 April 1880–?), married on 8 January 1901, in Vienna to Felix von Cienski-Cienie (k.u.k. Hoflieferant, Lemberg Technicka 1.)
  - Marija-Malvina Bondić (21 December 1847–?), married in Dubrovnik on 19 October 1869 to Joseph Dorotka von Ehrenwall (Oberts. des. Inf.Reg.N°25; 29 January 1832 – 17 December 1897), they had 4 children:
    - Marija Dorotka von Ehrenwall, married in June 1897 to Antun de Difnico
    - Berta Dorotka von Ehrenwall
    - Jelena Dorotka von Ehrenwall (1876–1965), cubist painter, Jelena met many leading figures world painting (Matisse, Chagall, Picasso, Van Dongen, Laurencin, and others), and worked for a time in the Matisse Painting School. She married Otto Hoffmann (b. 1872). Jelena lived in Paris from 1907 to 1914. and had an atelier at the Montparnasse, she was friend with Marie Vassilieff and founder of the famous Paris Academie Russe (Academia Vassilieff), and met another Croatian sculptor, Ivan Meštrović. Upon the outbreak of World War I left France, and after several years of wandering in Europe came in 1922.
    - Georg Dorotka von Ehrenwall
  - Ivanka Nikoleta Bondić (born 10 May 1855), married on 24 April 1882 to Count Đivo Krstitelj Božidarević, remarried Ivanka and had two children:
    - Rometta Božidarević
    - Đivo Božidarević

Burakowka 1929

== See also ==
- Republic of Ragusa
- Dubrovnik
- Post-Roman patriciates
- Dalmatia

== Sources ==
- Mahnken, Irmgard (1960). Dubrovački patricijat u XIV veku: Tables. Naučno delo.
- Gothaisches Genealogisches Taschenbuch der Gräflichen Häuser 1864, 1865 (Stammreihe & Ältere Genealogie) bis 1941.
- Genealogisches Handbuch des Adels Bd. 53 (1972) - Adelslexikon Bd. 1 (A-Bon), Seite 498.
