= Resti family =

Noble family of the Republic of Ragusa

Resti Restić
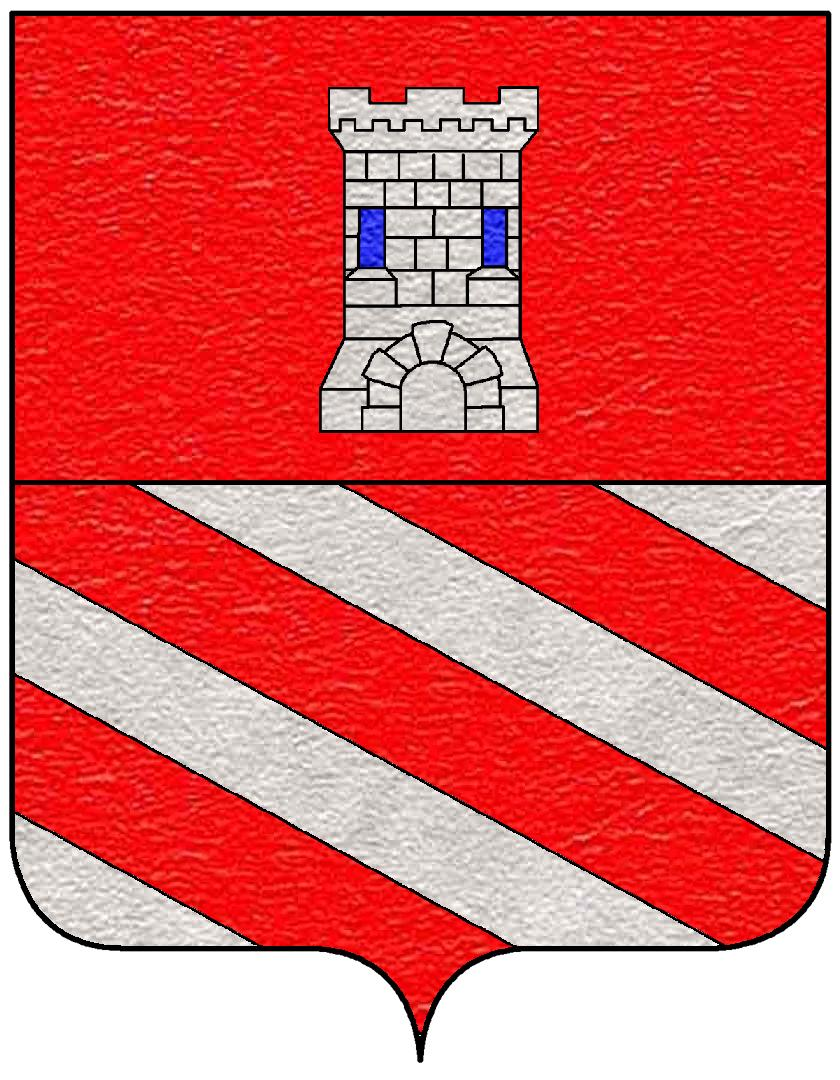
- Country: Republic of Ragusa
- Founded: 14th century

The House of Resti or Restić, was a Ragusan noble family. It was an old patrician family, originating in Dalmatia.

== History ==
In the 14th century, it was made up of two branches. In the beginning of the 15th century Ragusan nobility were present in Novo Brdo as merchants or mining lords; Resti were also present. After 1808, with the French occupation and division of the Ragusan nobility into two groups, the family joined the Salamancanists, along with the Bassegli, Benessa, Bonda, Buća, Giorgi, Bona, Gradi, Ragnina, and Tudisi, while Gondola, Palmotta, Proculo were Sorbonnists; the rest of Ragusan nobility had branches, more or less, in both groups.

== Members ==
- Vita de Resti
- Michael de Resti (1389–1396), Ragusan merchant, active at Drijeva.
- Michael de Resti (fl. 1420), procurator at the Bosnian court
- Giunio Resti (1671–1735), historian.
- Giunio Resti (1755–1814), politician, governor and writer

== Annotations ==
1. Also spelt Rasti. The name has been Slavicized into Restić and Rastić.

== Sources ==
- Mahnken, Irmgard (1960). Dubrovački patricijat u XIV veku: Tables. Naučno delo. pp. 125–.
- La Società dalmata (1985). Atti e memorie della Società dalmata di storia patria. La Società.
