= Basiljević family =

Noble family of the Republic of Ragusa

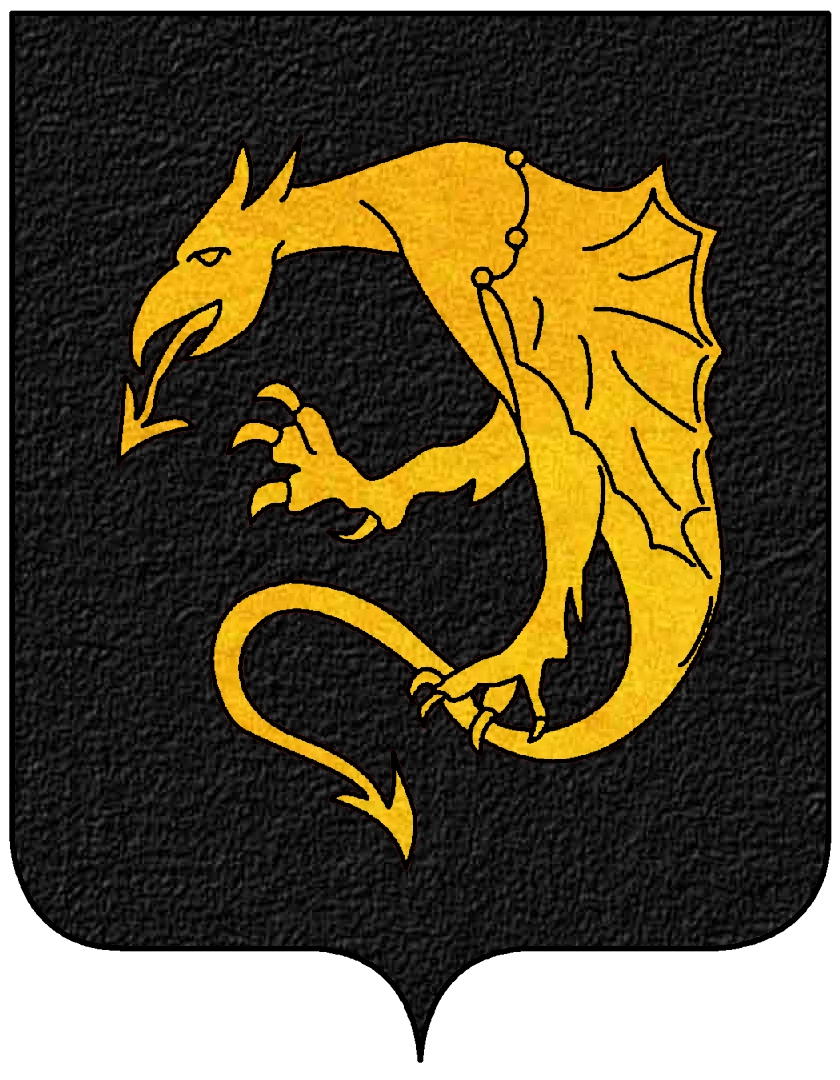
Coat of arms of the Basiljević noble family

The House of Basiljević (Basilio, Bassegli, Baseljić) was a noble family from the city of Dubrovnik, the Republic of Ragusa (modern-day Croatia).

== History ==
It originated from Kotor (ital. Cattaro), and seems to have been related to the Drago family, as the founder of all members of the family was Basilius Dragonis (fl. 1266–70). The Ragusan branch of the family was founded by Basilius de Basilio who was mentioned in a document dated 1314. The family was also involved in sea trade. Tomo Basiljević (1756–1806), the Englightener, envisaged a South Slavic country. After 1808, with the French occupation and division of the Ragusan nobility into two groups, the family joined the Salamancanists, along with the Benessa, Bonda, Buća, Giorgi-Bona, Gradić, Ragnina, Restić and Tudisi, while Gundulić, Palmotić, Prokulović were Sorbonnists; the rest of Ragusan nobility had branches, more or less, in both groups.

== Sources ==
- Mahnken, Irmgard (1960). Dubrovački patricijat u XIV veku: Tables. Naučno delo. pp. 125–.

== Annotations ==
1. The most used spellings are Bassegli and Basilio. Other spellings include Basselo, Basegio, Baseyo, Basiljević and Vasiljević.
