= Proculo =

Noble family of the Republic of Ragusa

The House of Proculo was a Ragusan noble family. They are mentioned in the 14th century, while a connection to earlier Proculi cannot be determined. Due to having few male descendants, they were unable to hold continuous political offices throughout the 14th century. In the beginning of the 15th century Ragusan nobility were present in Novo Brdo as merchants or mining lords; Proculo were also present. After 1808, with the French occupation and division of the Ragusan nobility into two groups, the family joined the Sorbonnists, along with the Gondola and Palmotta, while the Bassegli, Benessa, Bonda, Buća, Bona, Gradi, Ragnina, Resti and Tudisi were Salamancanists; the rest of Ragusan nobility had branches, more or less, in both groups.

== Members ==
- Martinussius de Proculo
- Michael de Proculo (13XX)
- Nale de Proculo (1312–63)

== Annotations ==
1. The most used spellings are Proculo and Proculi, rendered in Slavic as Prokulović.

== Sources ==
- Mahnken, Irmgard (1960). Dubrovački patricijat u XIV veku: Tables. Naučno delo. pp. 272, 371, 372.
