= Tudisi =

Noble family of the Republic of Ragusa

- Country: Republic of Ragusa

The House of Tudisi was a Ragusan noble family, which produced people such as distinguished diplomat Martholus de Tudisio and merchant Give de Tudisio in the 14th century.

== History ==
The basis of their economy was ties with the Republic of Venice in the 14th and 15th centuries. They were among the eleven smallest houses in the 15th century. After 1808, with the French occupation and division of the Ragusan nobility into two groups, the family joined the Salamancanists, along with the Bassegli, Benessa, Bonda, Buća, Giorgi, Bona, Gradi, Ragnina and Resti, while Gondola, Palmotta, Proculo were Sorbonnists; the rest of Ragusan nobility had branches, more or less, in both groups. The family moved to Venice, as did many of the other Ragusan patrician families.

== Members ==
- Martholus de Tudisio (fl. 1356–83), Ragusan diplomat to Venice
- Give de Tudisio (fl. 1348–50), Ragusan merchant

== Annotations ==
1. The most used spellings are Tudisi and Tudisio. Other spellings include Tediusio, Tedoyse, Teudisio, Theodoysio, Tidiso, Tiduiso, Todusio, Thodisio. In Croatian, the name is rendered Tudišević or Tudizić.

== Sources ==
- Mahnken, Irmgard (1960). Dubrovački patricijat u XIV veku: Tables. Naučno delo. pp. 15, 30, 52, 68, 78, 142, 158, 164, 314, 432–437.
- Bariša Krekić (1 January 1997). Dubrovnik. Ashgate Publishing Company. ISBN 978-0-86078-631-3.
