= Vlaho Kabužić =

Ragusan nobleman and diplomat

Vlaho Kabužić Blasius Caboga Biagio Caboga
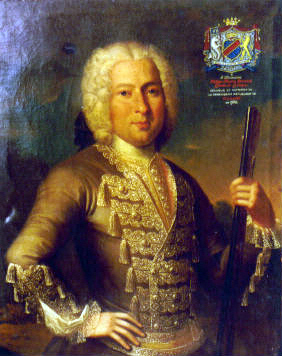
- Born: 27. December 1698; Dubrovnik, Republic of Ragusa
- Died: 1750; Dubrovnik, Republic of Ragusa
- Family: House of Kabužić
- wife: Katarina Kabužić (née Gundulić)
- Issue: Bernard, Ivan, Marin, Lukrecija, Marija, Uršula
- Father: Bernard Kabužić
- Mother: Marija Kabužić (née Božidarević)
- Occupation: diplomat

Vlaho Kabužić (Latin: Blasius Caboga, Italian: Biagio Caboga) (27 December 1698 – 1750), was a Ragusan nobleman and diplomat. He was a member of the influential Kabužić noble family. He is known for being poklisar harača (ambassador of harač), the man who brought the money from Dubrovnik to pay regular annual tribute to the Ottoman Sultan in Istanbul.

== Family ==
Vlaho Kaboga was the son of Bernard Kaboga and his wife Maria (née Bosdari). He had several brothers and sisters, among which was Marin, the duke of Slano. In 1732 he married Katarina Gundulić, a daughter of Dživo Šiškov Gundulić and great-granddaughter of Ivan Gundulić, the most prominent ragusan Baroque poet.

He had a large family, of whom two sons, Bernard and Ivan, were notable austrofils and freemasons, very influential Ragusan politicians who undertook many public duties. His grandsons Vlaho Filip "traditur" and Bernard-Brno were granted the title of count by the emperor of the Habsburg monarchy.

== Vlaho's branch of the Kabužić family tree ==
Lucijan; Franov (*? – †1603)
Bernard; Lucijanov
Lucijan; Bernardov	Marojica; Bernardov (*1630 – †1692)
Bernard (*1671 – †1753)	Marin (*1673 – †1740)
Vlaho (*1698 – †1750)	Marin (*1710 – †1790)
Bernard (*1739 – †1814)	Ivan (*1743 – †1826)	Antun (*1765 – †?)
Vlaho; Bernard (*1779– †1854)	Vlaho; Filip (*1774 – †1854)	Frano Vlaho; Martin (*1781 – †1855)	Bernard–Brno (*1785 – †1855)
Henrik; Nikola (*1818 – †1881)

== See also ==
- Republic of Ragusa
- List of notable Ragusans
- Dubrovnik
- House of Kabužić
- History of Dalmatia
