= Ignjat Đurđević =

Croatian poet

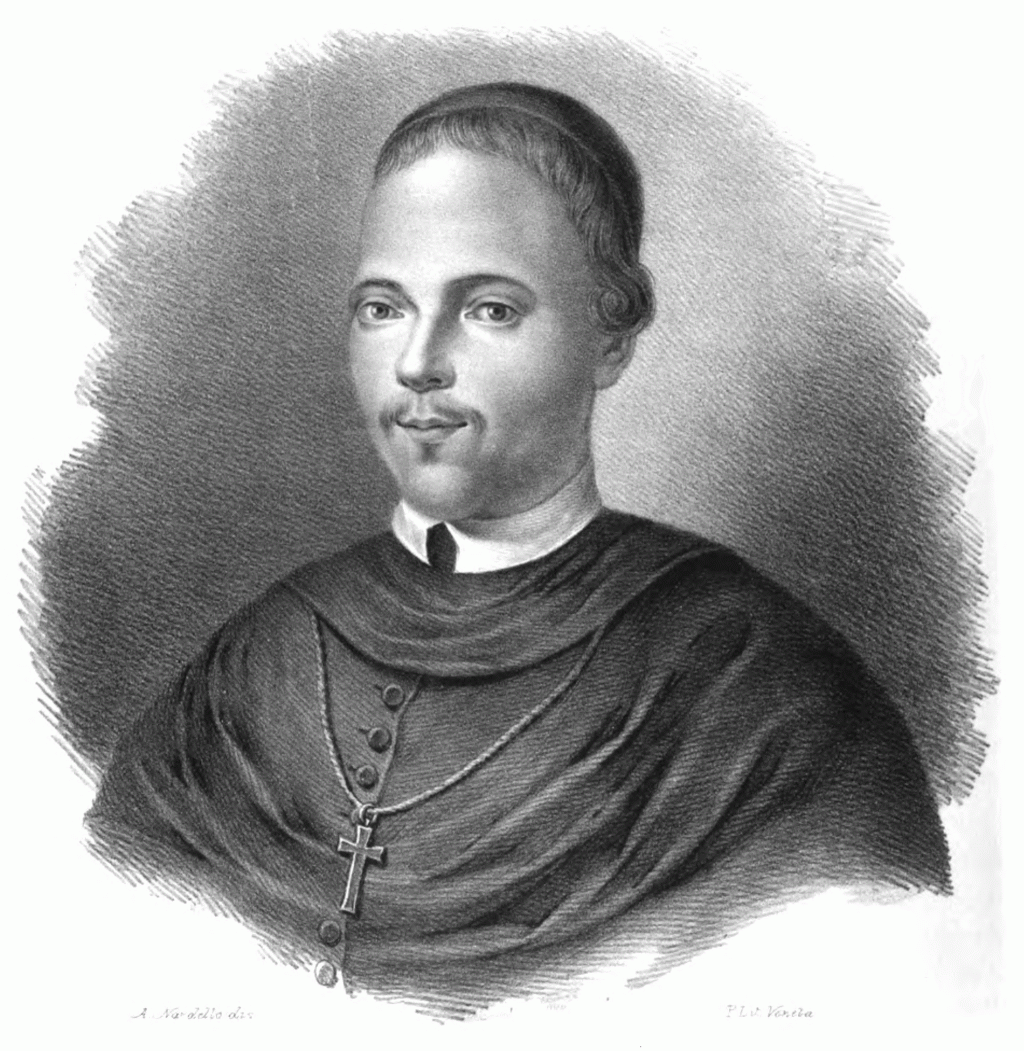
- Born: February 1675; Dubrovnik, Republic of Ragusa
- Died: 21 January 1737 (aged 61); Dubrovnik, Republic of Ragusa
- Other name: Ignazio Giorgi
- Occupations: Poet, translator

Ignjat Đurđević, also known as Ignazio Giorgi (February 1675 – 21 January 1737) was a Ragusan Baroque poet and translator, best known for his long poem Uzdasi Mandaljene pokornice ("The Sighs of the Repentant Magdalene"). He wrote poetry in Latin, Italian, and Croatian.

== Biography ==
Đurđević was born in Dubrovnik or Ragusa (now in Croatia) to Bernardo Giorgi and Teresa (née Zlatarić). He did not belong to the House of Giorgi, but to a minor, recently ennobled family, the Giorgi di Bernardo. He was a member of the Great Council (1693), duke of Šipan Island (1695)c and Lovrijenac fortress' captain (1696).

As a member of a rich and respectable family, he lived recklessly and often in debauchery. His love adventures cost him the position of the duke on Šipan. Because of his unrequited love towards a diklica (girl) from Dubrovnik and a libertine poem he wrote to her, Đurđević even had to leave the city for a while. In 1698, he joined the Jesuits in Rome, where he completed philosophy studies and worked as a teacher. In 1706, he joined the Benedictines in Dubrovnik, but was expelled from the city between 1710 and 1712 whereupon he lived in Rome and Naples.

He was a trilingual poet (he wrote in Latin, Italian and Croatian) with deep feelings, unrestrained by Catholic morals. His fiery Ljuvene pjesni ("Love Poems") are some of the best-known lyric poems from Dubrovnik, with the influences of Bunić's verse. Suze Marunkove ("Marunko's Tears"), Đurđević's poem about Marunko from the island of Mljet, who is sighing because of a beautiful djevičina (maid) Pavica, were inspired by Derviš by Stijepan Đurđević.

Đurđević collaborated with his contemporaries in Dubrovnik in the Akademija dangubnijeh, an academy started by learned men modeled after the Italian ones, and supported the ideas of one of its founders Đuro Matijašević about writing a Croatian grammar. He was voted the president of the academy in 1718, but soon retired from the position.

After more than twenty years of preparations, Đurđević printed Uzdasi Mandaljene pokornice ("The Sighs of the Repentant Magdalene") in Venice in 1728, together with the cycle of Croatian: Pjesni razlike ("Various Poems"). Magdalene is often considered his most beautiful work, while Poems have more varied themes and forms. Experts in Croatian literature, such as Mihovil Kombol and Ivo Frangeš, noticed that the themes and forms of Đurđević's Poems are similar to the poems of Fran Krsto Frankopan.

In 1729, his Saltijer slovinski ("Slavic Psalms") were printed in Venice. They contain translations or paraphrases of the psalms of King David. Their fine language and style distinguish them from many similar translations made by the poets of Dubrovnik.

== Ethnicity ==
His father was Bernardo Giorgi and his mother was Tereza Zlatarić. He did not belong to the old Đurđević family from Dubrovnik, originally from Rome, but to another family of the same name that received a noble title a few years before Ignjat's birth. His mother came from Zlatarić family that can trace their origins from the region of Macedonia. They later migrated to the area of Dubrovnik.The family belonged to the list of late patriciate families of the Ragusan nobility from 30 July 1667, as Miho Zlatarić was admitted into the patrician rank. The empress Maria Theresia in 1765 gave Pavao Zlatarić a Hungarian noble title. The family line became extinct in 1823.

== Publications ==
- Sighs of Repentant Magdalene (Uzdasi Mandaljene Pokornice), 1728

== See also ==
- List of notable Ragusans
- Dalmatia
- History of Dalmatia
