= Crosio =

Crosio may refer to:

- Janice Crosio (born 1939), Australian politician
- Luigi Crosio (1835–1915), Italian painter
- Crosio della Valle, Lombardy, Italy
- Croce family, based in Dubrovnik, Republic of Ragusa
