= Šiško Menčetić =

Ragusan poet

Šišmundo Menčetić (Italian: Sigismondo Menze), known simply as Šiško Menčetić (Croatian pronunciation: [ʃîʃko mɛ̂nt͡ʃɛtit͡ɕ]; 1457–1527) was a poet from Ragusa (modern-day Dubrovnik, Croatia), chiefly creating his opus in the 15th century.

== Biography ==
Menčetić was born in 1458 in the city of Dubrovnik, Republic of Ragusa, part of the aristocratic family of Menčetić, as the son of Šimun Menčetić and his wife, Veronika Đurđević. He spent his youth ribald and dissolute; his name is often mentioned in law documents of the Dubrovnik archive. He was charged in court due to incidents on city streets including the harassment of women. He served as an official in the Dubrovnik government in various positions; as a twenty-year-old he entered the Ragusan Small Council, and twice (in 1521 and 1524), he was the Duke of the Republic of Ragusa. Menčetić married in 1497 when he was 40. He died, with two of his sons, on June 25, 1527, in a major outbreak of the plague.

== Writings ==
=== Influences ===
Menčetić belongs to the first generation of Croatian lyrical poets, and most of his poems (512) have been preserved in Ranjina's Miscellany, in which he is the most represented poet.

As opposed to Džore Držić, Menčetić's opus contains longer lyrical narratives, and lyrical subject is more immediate, vigorous, lascivious and eroticized, and the topic of and the sensuality of reciprocated love is emphasized. The most distinguished role model is Francesco Petrarca, and that makes Menčetić, beside Džore Držić, the first Croatian Petrarchist. He belonged to the Strambottists, who detached themselves from certain Petrarchan ideas; notable was the absence of Neoplatonisms, sensuality came to be accentuated as the poets drew closer to vernacular forms (strambotto, rispetto), and sonnet was being abandoned. Most of the opus thematically inherits Petrarchism though - beauty and the pleasures of the poet's beloved are described, but in several poems Menčetić diverged from classical Petrarchism, celebrating the happiness of a lover whose pleas have been conceded.

Beside Petrarchian elements, Menčetić's opus demonstrates clearly discernible elements of Medieval poetry, either in terms of the Provençal troubadour lyric and the motif of servitude, or in terms of lexical influences of German culture (Minnesang). In two of Menčetić's songs lexeme frava can be found, which originates from Old High German frouwe (confer German Frau):Goraše svital raj u ličcu toj fravi and Pjesance, kad budeš na skutu toj fravi. Also present is the influence of folk motifs well-spread in the Middle Ages, amplified by the influences of Strambottisms, such as the rhyme of the folk song Mnokrat reci u sebi rič, koja je ohola or in the usage of diminutives (kladencem vodice), such as in the song Moj Bože, Bože moj, molim te za rados and the bugaršćica-type verse, with 15 syllables per line.

=== Form ===
Poems are usually versified in doubly rhymed dodecasyllable metre of Dubrovnik typed; dodecasyllabic with intransitive rhyme and secondary caesura after the third and the ninth syllable, with main caesure after the sixth syllable (e.g. Koji čtiš | sej pjesni ||, molim te | veselo), with the exception of three poems with 15-syllable meter, and the poem Isusu na križu written in Marulić-style dodecasyllabic with transitive rhyme.

=== Themes ===
His poems mostly contain love motifs, often in acrostic with the names of the women the poems were dedicated to, but there are also a number of satiricals and moral reflexives, as well as 11 religious poems dedicated to Jesus. The dominant type is declaratory or dialogue, i.e. appellative poem, exceptions being poems such as Zoviješe zora dan a slavno prolitje where no appellative traits are found. Three poems in "woman voice", in which the narrator is a woman, are characterized by a simple poetical language, a woman's lustful longing for the lover in his absence, and the simulation of written communication.

In the first thematic unit, poems like Ne mogu živjeti bez tebe are distinguished in which a beloved maiden becomes a part of lyrical subject (ter tebe želeći sam sebe toj želju) or couplet poems such Bože, šta osta tebi n which the beauties of the poet's beloved are platonically described.

The second thematic unit emphasizes sensuality and the perception of love (ar se mnjah u broju ne jedan nu prvi / od Grka ki Troju puštaše u krvi), such as in the poem Ljuveno uživanje, or lust, such as in the poem Ner tko je srcem lav i kamen u sebi. This thematic unit introduces the motif of alba, a poetic form describing the dialogue of lovers, with possible presence of a third person (the guardian), separated by the dawn.

The most famous poem of the second thematic unit is the Blaženi čas i hip, paraphrasing Petrarca's LXI. sonnet (Benedetto sia 'l giorno, e 'l mese, e l'anno). It is versified in dodecasyllabic couplets, odd verses following Petrarchan principles, and verses emphasizing sensuality. There is a Petrarchan platonist ending, celebrating the spiritual love towards Laura, as his inspiration and muse, eroticizes and mutates elegiac tone into dithyrambic, and the central motif is no longer the lyrical subject but the erotic perception of the beloved (Blažena ljepos tva, blažena tva mlados / pokli se meni sva darova za rados.)

Poems not themed on love are chiefly concerned with the absence of earthly love and the turn toward spiritual, which is manifested as 11 songs dedicated to Jesus, and one song dedicated to Virgin Mary (Uzmožna gospođe, tko milos ku žudi). Certain satirical poems are also found, with misogynistic elements of resignation (Uzdarje u ženu, Mrzim na žene), but also poems of general character, confrontation of wealth and miserliness (Zlo od Kotora, the first poetic trace of a traditional antagonism between Dubrovnik and Kotor).
