= Radagli =

Noble family of Venice and Ragusa

The House of Radagli or Radaljević (in Italian; Radaleus in Latin; Radaljević/Radeljević/Radelja in Croatian) was a noble family of the Republic of Venice in the 16th century and the Republic of Ragusa since 1666.

== Members ==
- Piero Nicolo Radagli (fl. 1551)
- M. Francesco Radagli (fl. 1573), merchant
- Marino Radagli (fl. 1596)
- Pietro Radagli (fl. 1666), received Ragusan noble status for the family along with the Dimitri, Zlatarić, and Marinetti-Primi, after initial denial
- Francesco Radagli (Croatian: Frano Radaljević; d. 1667), secretary
- Giovanni di Radagli
- Francesco Radagli (Croatian: Frano Radaljević), Franciscan.
- Marino di Matteo Radagli
- Marino Radagli
- Francesco di Pietro Radagli (Latin: F. Petri Radaleus, Croatian: Frano Perov Radaljević), Latinist
- Giuliano Radagli
- Giuseppe Radagli
- Jusepe Radagli, captain

== Sources ==
- Stjepan Krivošić (1990). Stanovništvo Dubrovnika i demografske promjene u prošlosti. Jugoslavenska akademija znanosti i umjetnosti u Zagrebu. ISBN 9788681265024.
- Dolci, Sebastiano (2001). Dubrovačka književna kronika. Hrvatski Institut za Povijest. ISBN 978-953-6324-30-9.
