= Nikša Ranjina =

Nikša Andretić Ranjina or Nicola Ragnina (1494–1582) was a writer and nobleman from the Republic of Ragusa (modern-day Dubrovnik), most famous as the compiler of Ranjina's Miscellany.

Ranjina is the most famous for his manuscript collection of Croatian Petrarchian poems known as Nikša Ranjina's Miscellany. The manuscript itself was destroyed in World War II. The manuscript had two pieces and contained about 820 poems, with (recognized) authors such as Šiško Menčetić (about 500 poems), Džore Držić (~70 poems), Mavro Vetranović, Marin Krističević and Mato Hispani.

Beside this well-known miscellany, he also compiled Ranjinin Lekcionar (started in 1508) (a collection of passages from the Bible), and the Dubrovnik chronicle Annali di Ragusa (1522). Whether some of the verses in the Miscellany were authored by Ranjina is not known, although it is possible.

== See also ==
- Ranjina's Miscellany

== Literature ==
- Živković, Tibor (2006). "Constantine Porhyrogenitus and the Ragusan Authors before 1611" (PDF). Историјски часопис. 53: 145–164.
