= Martinussio =

Noble family of the Republic of Ragusa

The House of Martinussio (also Martinuscio, Martinusso, Martinus; Croatian: Martinušić) were a noble family of the Republic of Ragusa.

== History ==
The family descended from comes Gervasius (fl. 1186–90) and his son Martinussius (fl. 1234–43). In the beginning of the 15th century Ragusan nobility were present in Novo Brdo as merchants or mining lords; Martinussio were also present. The family was extinct by 1595. They were not related to the Martini in Spalato, Martinuscio in Zara, or Martinussio in Cattaro.

== Members ==
- Vulci(g)na de Martinussio
- Nicola de Martinussio, iudex
- Angelus de Martinussio
- Micha(el) de Martinussio

== Sources ==
- La Società dalmata (1985). Atti e memorie della Società dalmata di storia patria. La Società.
