= Menčetić =

Noble family of the Republic of Ragusa

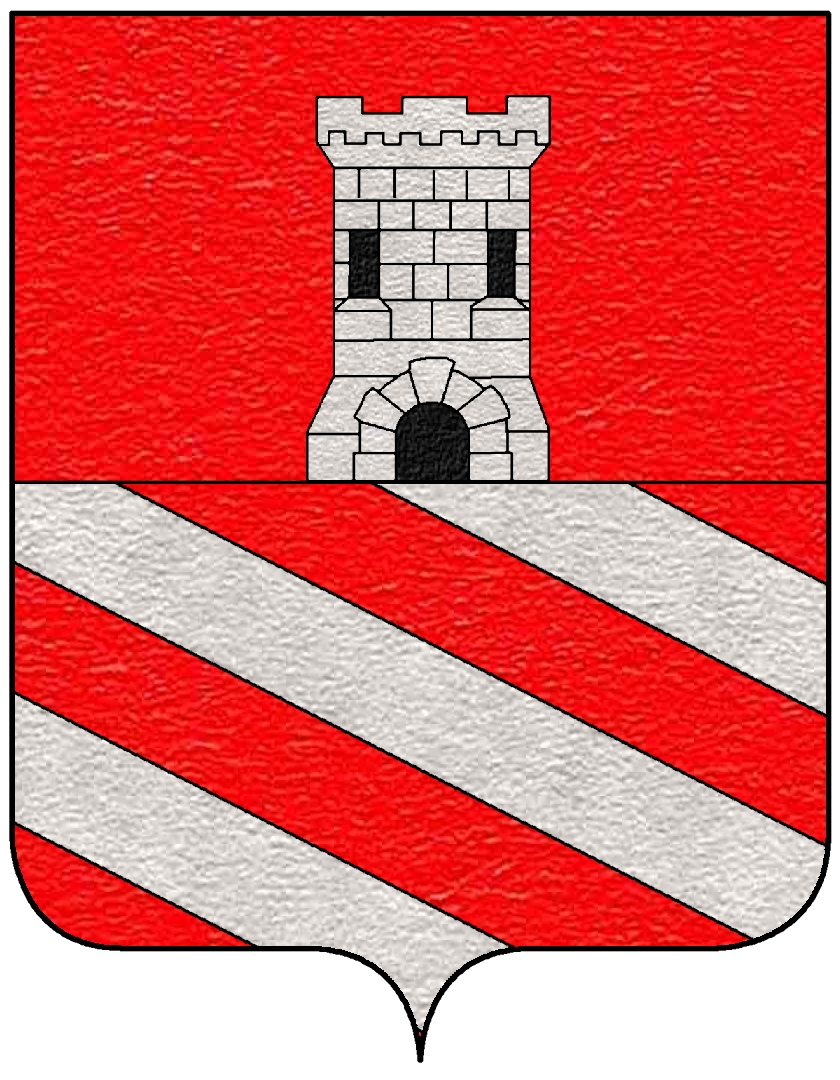
Coats of arms

The House of Menze or Menčetić (Italian: Mençe, Menze) was a noble family of the Republic of Ragusa in what is today known as Croatia.

== Name ==
In the 15th century the surname was mostly spelt Mençe. The Slavic variant is Menčetić.

== History ==
The family was said to come from Rome.

=== 15th century ===
The family was ranked 9th of the 10 largest Ragusan houses. The Menze inter-married mostly with the women from the Bona and Gondola family.

== Notable members ==
- Mateo Grube di Menze (d. 1381)
- Johannes Blasius de Mençe (late 15th c.)
- Orsolin Nicolin de Mençe (fl. 1421)
- Šiško Menčetić (1457–1527)
- Pietro Menze (Petar Menčetić, 1451–1508)
- Placido Menze
- Klement Marijan Domini Antun Menčetić, born in Dubrovnik, on 4 January 1747, son of Vlaho Klement Menčetić and Nika Getaldić
- Vlaho Antun Menčetić, son of Klement Đivo Menčetić and Marija Viktorija Kabužić, born in Dubrovnik, on 26 July 1729 and died 1778

== Sources ==
- Rheubottom, David (2000). Age, Marriage, and Politics in Fifteenth-century Ragusa. Oxford University Press. pp. 172 ff. ISBN 978-0-19-823412-8.
- Marković, Savo (2016). "MENZE (MENČE), THE PATRICIANS OF BAR. A CONTRIBUTION TO THE KNOWLEDGE OF ROMANCE-SLAVIC SYMBIOSIS". Istraživanja. 25: 89–109.
- Siebmacher. Dalmatien. pp. 12, 139.
