= Jelena Dorotka =

Croatian painter (1876–1965)

Jelena Dorotka Hoffmann née Jelena Dorotka von Ehrenwall (1 March 1876 – 19 May 1965) was a Dubrovniknian cubist painter.

Dorotka, a native of Dubrovnik, lived as an artist in Paris between 1907 and 1914, where she met many prominent figures of modern art, and became the first Ragusan cubist painter. After her return to Dubrovnik in 1922, she lived a largely anonymous life, and was virtually forgotten after her death. Her opus is only partially preserved. In the 21st century, interest in her life and work has been revived.

== Early life ==
Jelena Dorotka von Ehrenwall was born in Dubrovnik in 1876. She was the daughter of Joseph Dorotka von Ehrenwall (1832-1897), an officer in the Austro-Hungarian Army and his wife, Countess Maria Malvina Katarina Tomasa de Bonda (b. 1846). She finished elementary school in Dubrovnik and graduated from gymnasium in Trieste. Then she married Otto Hoffmann, who was, like her father, an Austro-Hungarian Army officer who served in Dubrovnik. The marriage lasted just several years, until her husband's death in 1906, at the age of 33.

== Paris years ==
Mother and Child (Majka i dijete), mixed technique, 1907–1914, private collection, Dubrovnik

After the death of her husband, Dorotka decided to pursue arts. She briefly studied painting and sculpture in Basel before moving to Paris in 1907. She had an atelier at 21 Avenue du Maine, Montparnasse, not far from her Paris home. She was friends with Russian-born painter Marie Vassilieff, founder of the famous Paris Académie Russe (later Académie Vassilieff). She met many leading figures in the world of painting (Matisse, Chagall, Picasso, Van Dongen, Laurencin, and others), and also worked for a time in the Matisse Painting School. She also met the famous Croatian sculptor Ivan Meštrović, with whom she remained in contact, as evidenced by her letters preserved in Meštrović's estate.

In 1914, upon the outbreak of World War I, Dorotka was, as a citizen of Austria-Hungary, forced to leave France, and her assets in the country were frozen.

== Exile in Spain ==
After leaving Paris in late September or early October 1914, Dorotka went to Spain, a neutral country. At first, she stayed in Barcelona, and then wandered between Palma de Mallorca, Ibiza and Alicante for the next five years. In Spain, she developed a close friendship with her Paris acquaintance Marie Laurencin, a French painter and printmaker who was likewise an exile from France, due to her German husband. The two artists also spent time drawing together.

== Return to Dubrovnik ==
After the end of World War I, Dorotka decided to return to her homeland. Between July 1920 and September 1922, she worked for a hydroelectric power plant company in Dugi Rat, near Omiš. She was fluent in Italian, German, French and Spanish, and was employed as a translator and correspondent.

By that time, her financial resources were depleted, and she petitioned the Yugoslav embassy in Paris to help her get compensation for her confiscated Paris property. There is no evidence she was successful, and her modest means since then suggest little or no compensation was actually received.

In 1922, Dorotka returned to Dubrovnik. She lived the rest of her life in anonymity, making a very modest living from beekeeping and growing of cacti. Citizens of Dubrovnik remembered her for her elegant appearance, as well as for her somewhat eccentric and bohemian lifestyle. Dorotka had a reputation for her extensive knowledge of art, and occasionally received visits from local artists and art historians, who would discuss fine art topics with her. She continued painting, but - for reasons unknown - she destroyed most of her works.

Dorotka died in a Dubrovnik hospital in 1965 and was buried in a family tomb in Lapad cemetery.

== Legacy ==
Due to spending most of her life in Dubrovnik in near-complete anonymity, by the end of the 20th century Dorotka was virtually forgotten. Her opus was only partially preserved, and some of her effects were destroyed after her death, including very likely some of her drawings. Her family archive is kept by the Croatian State Archives in Dubrovnik. Some of her works from the Paris years may have survived in private collections in France.

In the 21st century, interest in Dorotka's work has been somewhat revived. Her first biography was published in 2007. A 2008 Croatian documentary, Jelena Dorotka - od Konala do Montparnassea, chronicled her life story.

== Bibliography ==
- Viđen, Ivan (December 2007). "Jelena Dorotka Hoffmann (1876 - 1965.) - tragom zaboravljene kubističke slikarice" [Jelena Dorotka Hoffmann (1876 - 1965) - rediscovering a forgotten female cubist painter] (PDF). Peristil (in Croatian). 50 (1). Zagreb: Croatian Society of Art Historians: 285–294.
