= Mlaschagna =

Noble family of the Republic of Ragusa

Mlaschagna Mlaskonja
- Country: Republic of Ragusa
- Founded: 13th century

The House of Mlaschagna (Croatian: Mlaskonja) was a Ragusan noble family.

The founder was Marinus f. Michaelis de Mascana (1282–1313). They did not play an important part in politics in the 14th and 15th centuries. In the beginning of the 15th century Ragusan nobility were present in Novo Brdo as merchants or mining lords; Mlascagna were also present. In the 14th century, they held offices of mid-importance. They were among the eleven smallest houses in the 15th century.

== Annotations ==
1. Other spellings include Mlascagna, Mlascogna, rendered in Slavic (Croatian) as Mlaskonja.

== Sources ==
- Mahnken, Irmgard (1960). Dubrovački patricijat u XIV veku: Tables. Naučno delo. pp. 350–.
