= Pavlić noble family =

Noble family in Republic of Ragusa

Pavlić noble family Paoli (in Italian), Pauli (in Latin)
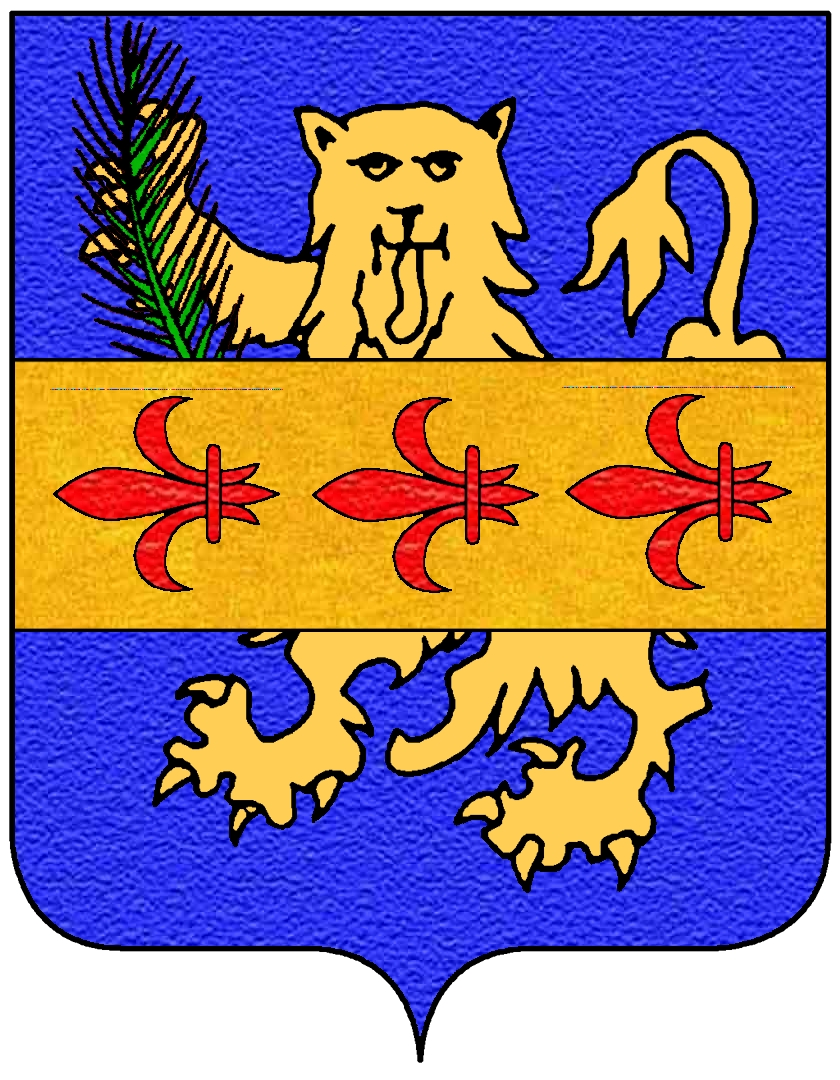
- Coat of arms of the House of Pavlić
- Country: Republic of Ragusa
- Founded: 28 August 1670
- Current head: extinct
- Dissolution: 18th century

The House of Pavlić (Italian: Paoli, Latin: Pauli) was a noble family in the Republic of Ragusa, based in Dubrovnik in the 17th and 18th centuries.

== History ==
The family was admitted into the noble status on 28 August 1670, as the Grand Council (Consilium maius), a ruling body consisting of all adult male noblemen of the Republic, held its session and decided so by simple majority. The first noble member of the family, Andrija Pavlić, was introduced into the patrician circle of Dubrovnik nobility with a vote of 27 for and 21 against. He had to pay 1500 gold ducats as a contribution to the Republic treasury.

Andrija Pavlić, a son of Ivan Petar Pavlić, was born in ca. 1630 and was a member of a wealthy citizen family. There were some other distinguished and wealthy citizens who were ennobled during the 17th century, because the number of patrician families was affected by a biological crisis, i.e. a negative trend in demographic processes was leading to their most certain extinction in the future. So a more liberal attitude of the Grand Council enabled some citizens to apply and purchase their noble rank. First of them was Vlaho Božidarević (Italian: Bosdari), who was introduced to Grand Council on 5 November 1666, followed by Miho Sorkočević-Bobaljević (Italian: Sorgo-Bobali) on 10 November 1666, and so on.

The Pavlić family belonged to so called „late patriciate families" or „new nobility" and sided with the Sorbonnist faction of the Dubrovnik aristocracy, which accepted it as equal class, but it was not affiliated with Salamancanist faction, which resisted and rejected marriages with newcomers. Members of the Pavlić family kept noble status until the end of the 18th century, most probably until 1792, but surely they were extinct in 1800.
