= Klašić =

Noble family of the Republic of Ragusa

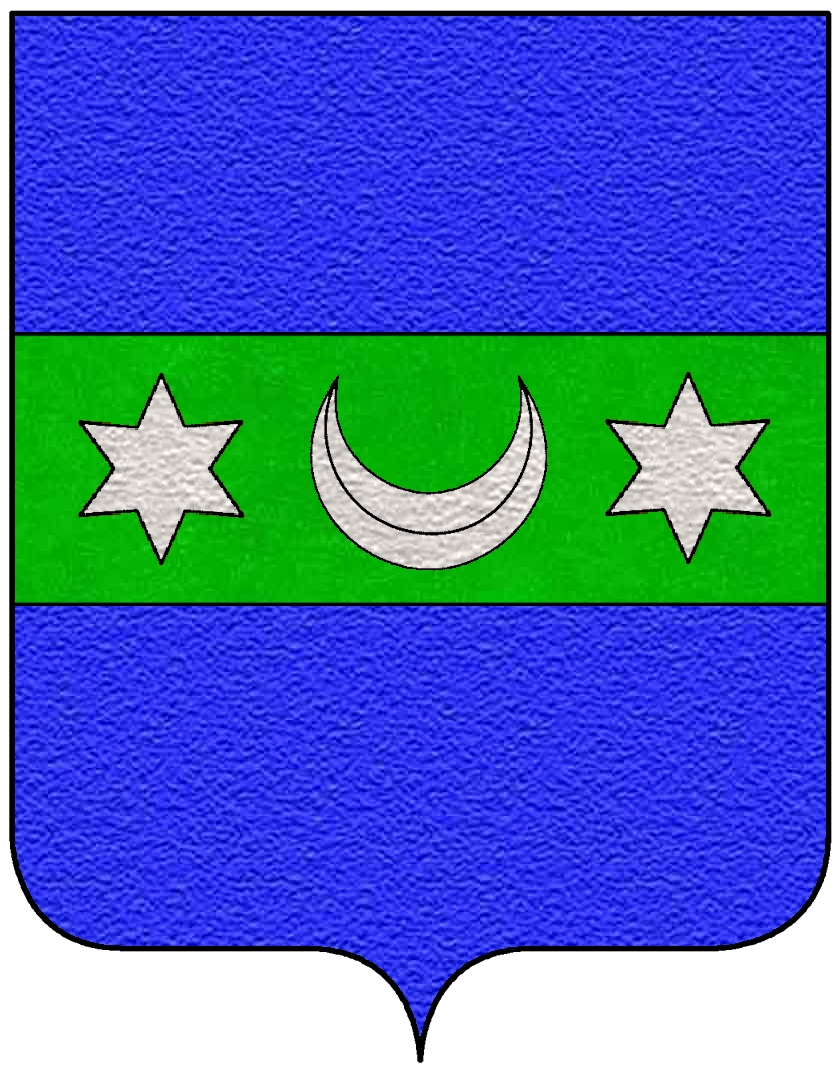
Coat of arms of the Klašić family

The House of Clasci or House of Klašić was a noble family from the city of Dubrovnik and the Republic of Ragusa. They belonged to the list of late patriciate families of the Ragusan nobility.

== See also ==
- Dubrovnik
- Republic of Ragusa
- Dalmatia
