= Rastić =

Rastić (Serbian Cyrillic: Растић, pronounced [rǎːstitɕ]) is a Serbo-Croatian surname, derived from hrast ("oak") or rastiti ("to grow"). It may refer to:

- Damir Rastić (born 1988), Serbian biathlete
- Resti (family), Ragusan family
