= Calich =

Noble family of the Republic of Ragusa

- Noble house
- Country: Republic of Ragusa
- Estate: In Dubrovnik

The House of Calich was a Ragusan noble family. They were first mentioned in the period of 1279–1317. In 1377, a "Dobre de Calich" is mentioned. In the beginning of the 15th century Ragusan nobility were present in Novo Brdo as merchants or mining lords; Calich were also present. In 1457 a "Calice" is mentioned in Novo Brdo. They were among the eleven smallest houses in the 15th century.

== Annotations ==
1. They are mostly known as "Calich". In the 15th century the spelling "Chalich" was also used. In 1500 "Calleti" is noted. In Slavic, Cyrillic documents of the 14th and 15th centuries, the name "Kaličević" is used. A Slavic variant "Calichic" (Kaličić) was noted in the 15th century. In modern Croatian historiography, "Kalić" is also used.

== Sources ==
- Jireček, Konstantin (1904). Die Romanen in den städten Dalmatiens während des mittelalters. In commission bei C. Gerold's sohn.
- Mahnken, Irmgard (1960). Dubrovački patricijat u XIV veku: Tables. Naučno delo.
- Krekić, Bariša (1997). Dubrovnik. Ashgate Publishing Company. ISBN 978-0-86078-631-3.
