= Vodopić =

Noble family of the Republic of Ragusa

The House of Vodopić was a noble family from the city of Dubrovnik and the Republic of Ragusa. The family belonged to the list of late patriciate families of the Ragusan nobility.

== Notable members ==
- Mato Vodopić, Bishop of Dubrovnik
- Vito Marija Bettera-Vodopić

== See also ==
- Dubrovnik
- Republic of Ragusa
- Dalmatia
