= Nikša Ranjina's Miscellany =

- Dubrovnik, Republic of Ragusa
- Date: 1507 — unknown
- Scribe: Nikša Ranjina
- Author(s): mostly Šiško Menčetić and Džore Držić
- Contents: more than 800 poems

Nikša Ranjina's Miscellany, or simply Ranjina's Miscellany, is the oldest lyrical miscellany of Croatian vernacular lyric poetry, one of the most important pieces of Croatian Renaissance literature.

Writer of the miscellany is a Dubrovnik nobleman Nikša Ranjina, who started copying down poems in his childhood. He started writing them in 1507 as a thirteen-year-old boy, and it is not known when he finished the piece. The resulting voluminous manuscript corresponds in character to English Tottel's Miscellany. Poems in the miscellany deal chiefly with the topic of love and are written prevalently in doubly rhymed dodecayllabic meter. Most of the poems are authored by Šiško Menčetić and Džore Držić, and a minority by other, unknown poets, representing the first generation of Dubrovnik Petrarchists. The miscellany is written in legible handwriting, and in a very pedantic and reliable way.

Love is being celebrated and described in the miscellany not as much as a topic of poet's intimate perception, but rather as a form of social play governed by prescribed norms of conduct. Poems list various phases and forms of love: wooing, declaration of love, plea to return love, celebration of physical and spiritual attributes of the loved one, "fairy maidens", pain of unrequited love etc. As recipients, objects of poet's messages, fairies, maidens, Amor, but also various objects and phenomena are referred to.

In a literary and historical perspective, Ranjina's Miscellany represents a synthesis of diverse literary influences, ranging from troubadour-knightly and medieval Italian, all the way to various instances of Petrarchan poetry and Petrarchism. Sometimes the relationships with vernacular, Croatian folk lyrics are emphasized, even though it's hard to make precise judgment on it as there are no other records of Croatian folk lyrics of that period.

Ranjina's Miscellany contains more than 800 poems, in a very unusual organization, likely reflecting its multifarious origins. It is composed from two parts. The first part of 610 poems contains poems authored probably only by Šiško Menčetić and Džore Držić, arranged alphabetically according to the first word of the poem, without the attribution of the authorship. The second part (poem 611–820) lists poem of various authors, again in alphabetical order, some of which can be ascribed to Menčetić since they're found also in the manuscripts of that author. For some of them it cannot be definitely ascertained whether they're Menčetić's or Držić's (but certainly are written by one of them). One of the poems has been signed by Marin Krstičević, and to him are also attributed a couple of poems expressing the maiden's complaint, linked with the baracola type, the girl shouting the name of her beloved to the oncoming sailors. One can also with certainty be assigned to Mato Hispani, and two of the poems are Vetranović's; the authorship of the rest of the poems has been variously guessed. A number of poems, displaying through the acrostic the name of Kata, are usually attributed to a certain Andrija Zlatar ('Andrew the Goldmisth'), sometimes identified with Andrija Čubranović, of whom again nothing is known for certain except that a zingaresca, now attributed to Mikša Pelegrinović, was published under his name. Some of the Kata poems are typical of the new sentiment and style.

The anonymous folk-style poems (na narodnu, as they were dubbed a hundred years ago by the first editor of the collection, Vatroslav Jagić) were previously attributed to Džore Držić. Some of them seem to be just recorded oral poetry, but some imitate the country-side manner with an attitude of good-humoured teasing. Some again, as Odiljam se ('I Take My Leave of You') are nodoubtedly remnants of an older, pre-Petrarchan fashion. Authors of folk-stype poems abundantly and consciously lean on the poetry of the contemporary oral poetry, incorporating sporadically elements of non-folk origin, such as the rhyme form or the elements of more "scholarly" concepts of loving relationship.

The manuscript of the Miscellany was published in two critical editions: the first by Vatroslav Jagić in 1870 and the second by Milan Rešetar in 1937, in a completely reorganized edition in which some obsolete Jagić's assumptions were abandoned. Both of the editions were in the Academy's series of Stari pisci hrvatski ('Old Croatian writers'), and expanded with the poems originating from younger manuscripts. The original of Ranjina's Miscellany was held in the library of Zadar gymnasium and has been destroyed during the Axis bombings in World War II.

Nikša Ranjina's Miscellany is nowadays chiefly mentioned with regard to Menčetić's and Držić's name, which is in fact misleading. Had not Ragusan noblemen compiled his manuscript, their poems would still be known from younger sources. Ranjina's Miscellany is above all an important source of anonymous texts it has preserved and which do not make appearance in other sources. Without it, an insight into the production of smaller poets from the end of the 15th century and the beginning of the 16th century, not known by name nowadays and probably not all that important, could not have been gained, and that insight is valuable for establishing the type, dynamics and the development of the contemporary Dubrovnik literary life. The miscellany also bears witness of the popularity of the first generation of Dubrovnik love poets, i.e. it is an important evidence of the early spread - almost dominance, of vernacular love lyrics in Dubrovnik. It was obviously at the beginning of the 16th century a well-established phenomenon having developed a series of completely formal conventions.
