= Saraka =

Noble family of the Republic of Ragusa

Saraka (de) Saraca
- Country: Republic of Ragusa; Austro-Hungarian Empire; Italy
- Founded: 1172
- Titles: Count

The House of Saraka or Saraca is an old noble family from the Republic of Ragusa. The family came from Kotor in the year 1172.

== Austrian branch ==
Aristocratic status was granted to the following members of the family on 10 October 1817 by the Austrian Empire, after the fall of the Republic.

- Nikola Saraka (29 November 1650 – 1712), married Marija Bobali (29 November 1650 – 1712) on 5 March 1660.
- Natal Saraka (born 17 July 1694) married Marija Prokulić (born 4 October 1703)
- Vlaho Saraka (born c. 1731)

=== Line 1 ===
- Pavle Saraka (born 9 March 1733) married Ana Bazić. Their children were:
  - Marija Antonija Saraka
  - Marija Agneza Saraka
  - Orsat Saraka
  - Natal Saraka
  - Helena Stanislavova Sorgo (born 27 February 1793)

Children:

- Pavla
- Pavle
- Vladislav

Children:

- Rafael
- Helena
- Orsat Marijan Dominko

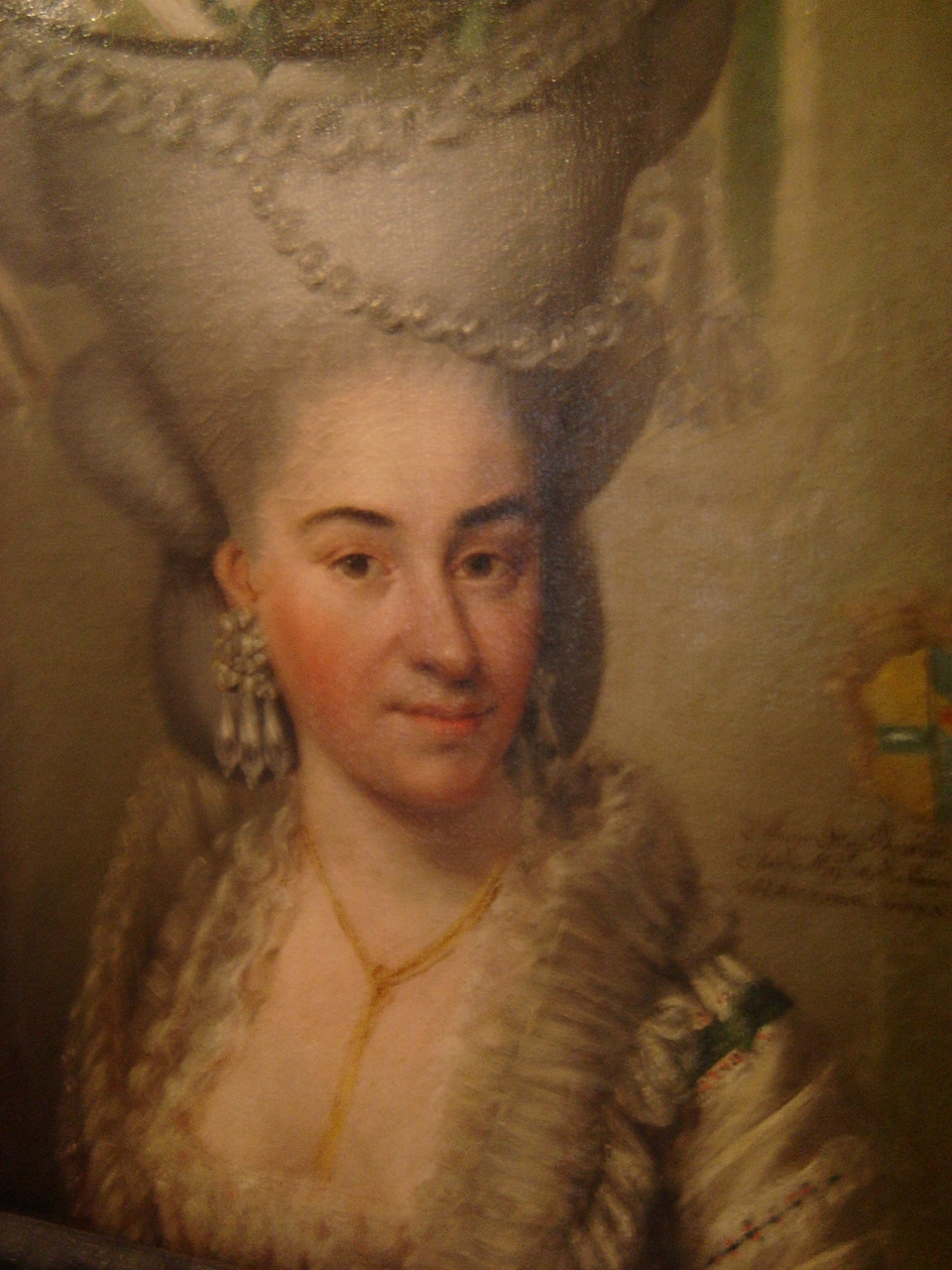
Ana Getaldić

- Rozeta Čekotić (30 December 1832 – 27 October 1890)
- Helena
- Nikola
- Maksim
- Magdalena
- Anonija, married Đivo Bučić

Children:

- Klotilda
- Roza
- Grgur
- Natal, born on a ship during the Battle of Vis on 20 July 1866
- Josipa Bučić (12 June 1867 – 3 July 1952)

Children:

- Orsat
- Marinela (28 April 1893 – 15 April 1982)
- Rozeta
- Rodolfo Scopini (19 March 1888 – 4 September 1940)
- Grgur
- Klotilda (1897–1906)
  - Klotilda married Panayotis Panagakis and had one child, Etty, born in 1922
- Giuseppe Seifert (26 October 1891 – 11 June 1969)
- Marija (26 October 1891 – 11 June 1969)
- Badia Polesine (17 July 1900 – 30 April 1990)
- Konrad Kalebić (1895–18 August 1928), son of Carlotta de Zamagna. They had one daughter:
  - Karla Kalebić, she married Gino Sotti with whom she had the following children:
    - Maria Grazia Sotti
    - Rosella Sotti
    - Anna Maria Sotti
    - Lucia Sotti
- Henrik (13 December 1901–13 February 1996)
- Zadar (5 March 1904 – 1 August 1981)
- Ana Bačić (19 February 1911 – 9 October 2007)
- Petar (1 November 1905 – 30 January 1968)
- Elizabeta Zanon (17 October 1904 – 28 December 1989)
- Silvije (28 March 1907 – 19 February 1972)
- Costantina Bianchini (7 October 1902 – 3 July 1985)
- Jakov (24 June 1910 – 13 May 1992)
- Marija Gracija Grošetić (16 June 1910 – 26 December 2000)
- Evald (1911–1911)

=== Line 2 ===
- Natal Lujo Saraka (born 10 April 1739)
- Ana Getaldić (born 9 July 1762)

Children:

- Magdalena
- Marija Katarina, date of birth unknown, died in Dubrovnik on 11 May 1864. Married Vlaho Filip Kaboga (25 May 1774 – 13 May 1854) in Dubrovnik on 26 October 1806.
- Šimun (Šime)
- Natal
- Nikola (born 3 February 1792)

Children:

- Natal
- Matej
- Stjepan (born 31 July 1797)

Children:

- Đule, k.u.k. Oberst, married Helena Herdt in Kassel.
- Stanislav (born in 1838), k.u.k. Major, married Auguste Rittler (c. 1844–7 March 1906)
- Children:
- Stanislav Saraka (17 October 1873–May 1945), married Bertha Dacziczky von Hessiowa on 24 April 1906, in Prague.

Children:

- Marija (9 May 1911)
- Ilija (31 March 1913)
- Henrik (c. 1841–30 August 1916), k.k. Kämmerer, married a woman named Matilda.

Children:

- Nikša (born 10 May 1911), k.k. Richter in Dubrovnik, married Đina Marinković.
- Ivo
- Eugen (17 October 1836 – 27 November 1899)

Children:

- Artur, k.u.k Präsident des Obersten Gerichtshofes von Sarajevo (born on 21 March 1877)
- Ines, married Karlo v. Hreljanović in Zagreb, he was in charge at the Agriculture School in Gruz, with the owner Baron Frano Gundulić, from 1885 until 1900.

== Confirmation of nobility ==
The Austrian Empire confirmed the aristocratic status of the Saraka brothers, Natal, Nikola, and Stefan on October 10, 1817. The last Saraka who received the confirmation of nobility was Natal Frano Saraka, on March 27, 1835. According to Baron v. Procházka; the family Saraka "is one of the four still (1928)oldest existing from the Middle Ages, from Ston, in the Republic of Ragusa, the family immigrated to Italy, from the family were many consuls and Knez of the Republic of Ragusa".

The aristocracy of the family was recognized on 24 August 1927 in the Kingdom of Italy to the son of Count Orsat Saraka and Roza Čekotić (and their descendants).

== See also ==
- Republic of Ragusa
- Dubrovnik
- Dalmatia
- Post-Roman patriciates

== Sources ==
- Siebmacher "Dalmatien", p. 20.
- Roman Freiherr v. Procházka: Meine zweiunddreißig Ahnen und ihre Sippenkreise, Leipzig 1928, p. 309
- Vittorio Spreti: Enciclopedia storico-nobiliare italiana, Band 6, Milano 1932, p. 129
- Libro d’oro della nobiltà italiana 2005-2009 (Band 28), p. 525
