= Croce family =

Noble family of the Republic of Ragusa

Croce Crosio (in Latin), Crosio (in Italian)
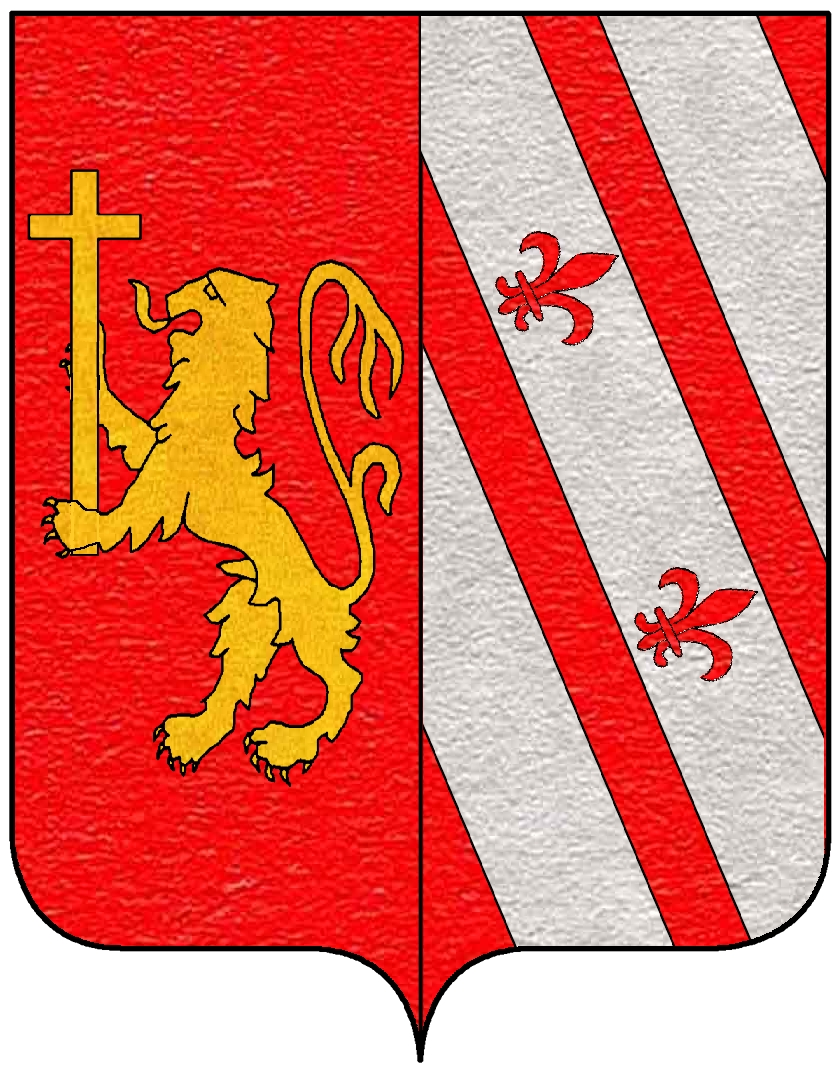
- Country: Republic of Ragusa
- Founded: 13th century (or earlier)
- Current head: extinct
- Dissolution: 18th century

The House of Croce or Kručić (Latin: Crosio) was a noble family in the Republic of Ragusa, based in Dubrovnik. Some of its representatives were state officials and the family is considered to be among the ten richest families of the Republic in the 14th century.

== History ==
There are very few reliable data on the family's early history. The first known mention appears in the 13th century. During the 14th century members of the family took part in land/estate allocations of newly acquired territories: in Pelješac (1333), in upper parts of Astarea (1366), and in Dubrovačko Primorje (1399) northwest from the city.

From 1440 to 1640, there were in total 10 members of the family who entered the Grand Council (Consilium maius), a body consisting of all adult Ragusan noblemen. Two of them were elected to the Senate (Consilium rogatorum), and a single one as "rector" (or knez) of the Republic, the head of the state.

In the beginning of the 15th century Ragusan nobility were present in Novo Brdo as merchants or mining lords; Croce were also present.

Although small and not branchy, gradually losing its wealth and influence, the family still persisted until the 18th century, when its last descendant died.

The most notable member of the family was Joannes de Cruce (Ivan Kručić), a Ragusan Dominican who became bishop of Ston (and later bishop of Korčula) at the end of the 13th and the beginning of the 14th century.
