= Bernhard Caboga-Cerva =

Austrian general

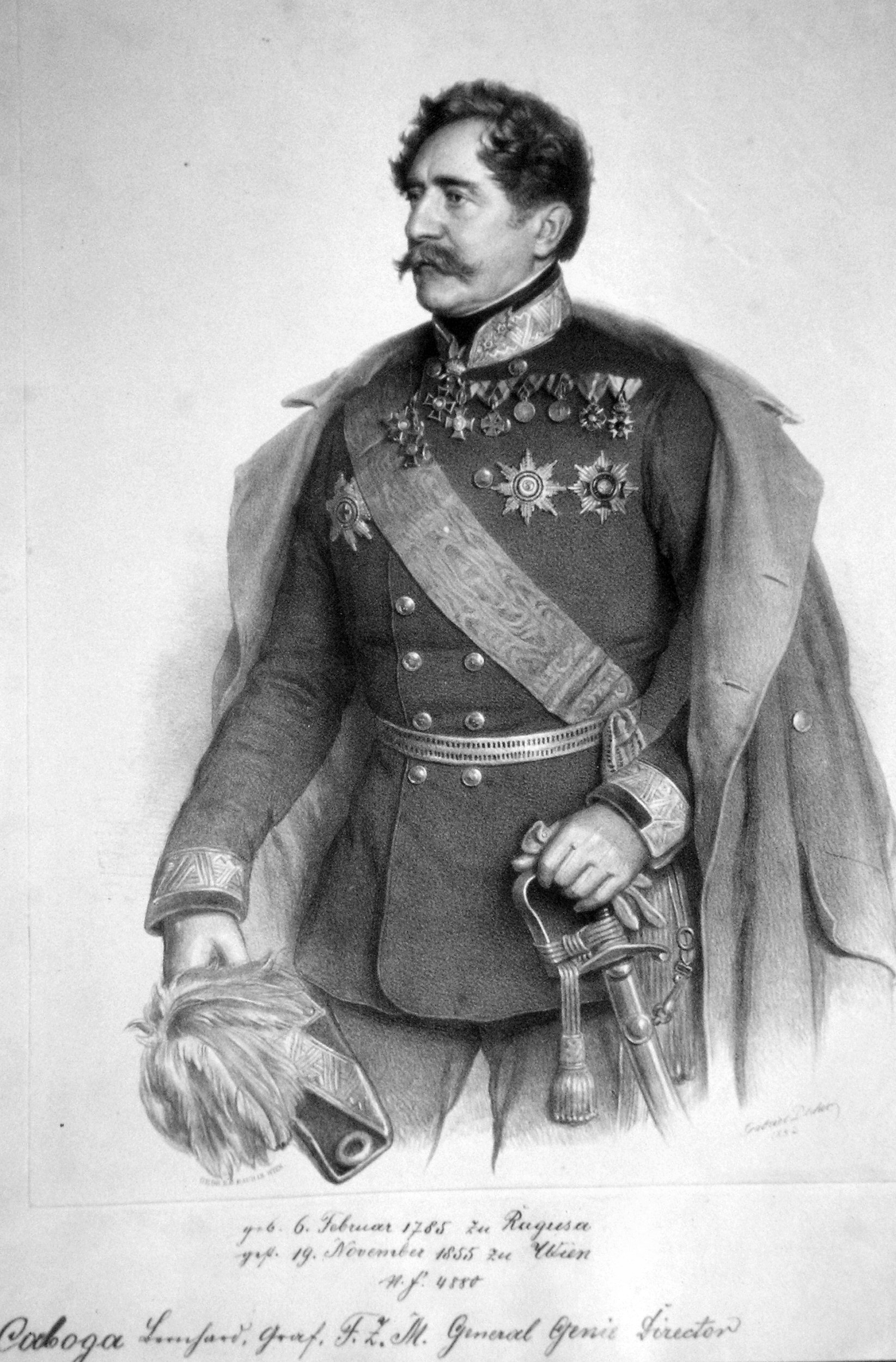
- Born: 6 February 1785; Ragusa
- Died: 19 November 1855 (aged 70); Vienna
- Occupation: military officer

Bernhard Caboga-Cerva (Croatian: Bernard Kaboga, 6 February 1785 – 19 November 1855) was a count and general from the Austrian Empire. He was born in Dubrovnik in 1785 and was a descendant of the Ragusan noble family of Caboga.

After graduating from an engineering academy, he was appointed oberlieutenant in the cartographic service in 1803 and assigned to the army of the Swedish Crown Prince in 1813. After diplomatic missions to the Joni Islands of Albania and Montenegro, he worked at Okkupation Neapels in 1821 and then with the Prince of Hessen Homburg in the Russian headquarters (1819–27). In 1824 he was appointed major, then in 1830, Oberstleutnant. After promotion to kommandant des mineur-korps, he was posted to the staff of the marshals Dibitsch and Paskević (1821–22), followed by detachments to the Dalmatians and the Bohmens as commander of the mineur corps (1835). Between 1836 and 1838, at the modenensichen Hofe, along with the sons of the Duke of Modena, he was assigned to the chief of fortifikations-direktor in Bohmen as colonel. This was later followed by promotion to major general in 1838, field marshal lieutenant (1848), general-direktor (1849) and Feldzeugmeister (1854).

In 1833 he married Julianne Wanda Potocki (born 1788), who died on 18 September 1876 in Lemberg, leaving no children.

He died in Vienna in 1855.

== See also ==
- List of notable Ragusans
