= Džore Držić =

Croatian poet and playwright (1461 – 1501)

Džore Držić (Croatian pronunciation: [dʒǒːre dř̩ːʒitɕ]; Italian: Giorgio Darsa) (February 6, 1461 – September 26, 1501) was a Ragusan poet and playwright.

== Biography ==
Držić was a citizen of the Republic of Ragusa (now Dubrovnik, Croatia). He was the uncle of the Croatian playwright Marin Držić, the rector of the Church of All Saints, the chancellor of the Dubrovnik chapter, and a contemporary of the poet Marko Marulić. His poetic works are considered an early expression of the linguistic form that would later become the standard Croatian language.

Držić's Pjesni ljuvene (Love Poems) was posthumously included by Nikša Ranjina in his manuscript collection, which also contained love poems composed by other young Dubrovnian poets for their romantic partners.

Some of Držić's poetry diverged from the conventional Petrarchist style, incorporating elements reminiscent of folk songs, some of which are included in Nikša Ranjina's Miscellany. Držić's poem Odiljam se ("I Am Going Away"), written in 16-syllable verses has influence from the bugarštica poetic tradition.

His eclogue Radmio and Ljubmir has been dated to the late 15th century and is the first Croatian play known to have a secular theme.

== See also ==
- Republic of Ragusa
- List of notable Ragusans
- Dubrovnik
- Dalmatia
- History of Dalmatia

== Sources ==
- Držić, Džore at lzmk.hr (in Croatian)
