= Zlatarić family =

Noble family of the Republic of Ragusa

Coat-of-arms of the House of Zlatarić.

The House of Zlatarić (Croatian pronunciation: [zlatǎrit͡ɕ]; Italian: Slatarich) was a noble family from the Republic of Ragusa.

== History ==
The Zlatarić family can trace their origins from the region of Macedonia. They later migrated to the area of Dubrovnik.The family belonged to the list of late patriciate families of the Ragusan nobility from 30 July 1667, as Miho Zlatarić was admitted into the patrician rank. The empress Maria Theresia in 1765 gave Pavao Zlatarić a Hungarian noble title. The family line became extinct in 1823.

== Name ==
"Zlatarić" etymologically originates from the Croatian word "zlatar", meaning "goldsmith".

== Coat of arms ==
The Coat of arms has a blue and golden diagonal on the left of the bar. The same is accompanied in such a manner on both sides by a similar rose.

== Notable members ==
Dinko Zlatarić, Ragusan poet and translator

== See also ==
- Post-Roman patriciates

== Sources ==
- Friedrich HEYER von Rosenfeld - "coat of arms book kingdom of the Dalmatien" in Siebmacher 1871, Nachträge P. 137.
- Siebmacher 1871, Nachträge p. 130

== Notes ==
- Name: Zlatarich. "zlatar" meaning "goldsmith" in Croatian
