= Kaboga family =

Patrician family from the city of Dubrovnik and its Republic of Ragusa

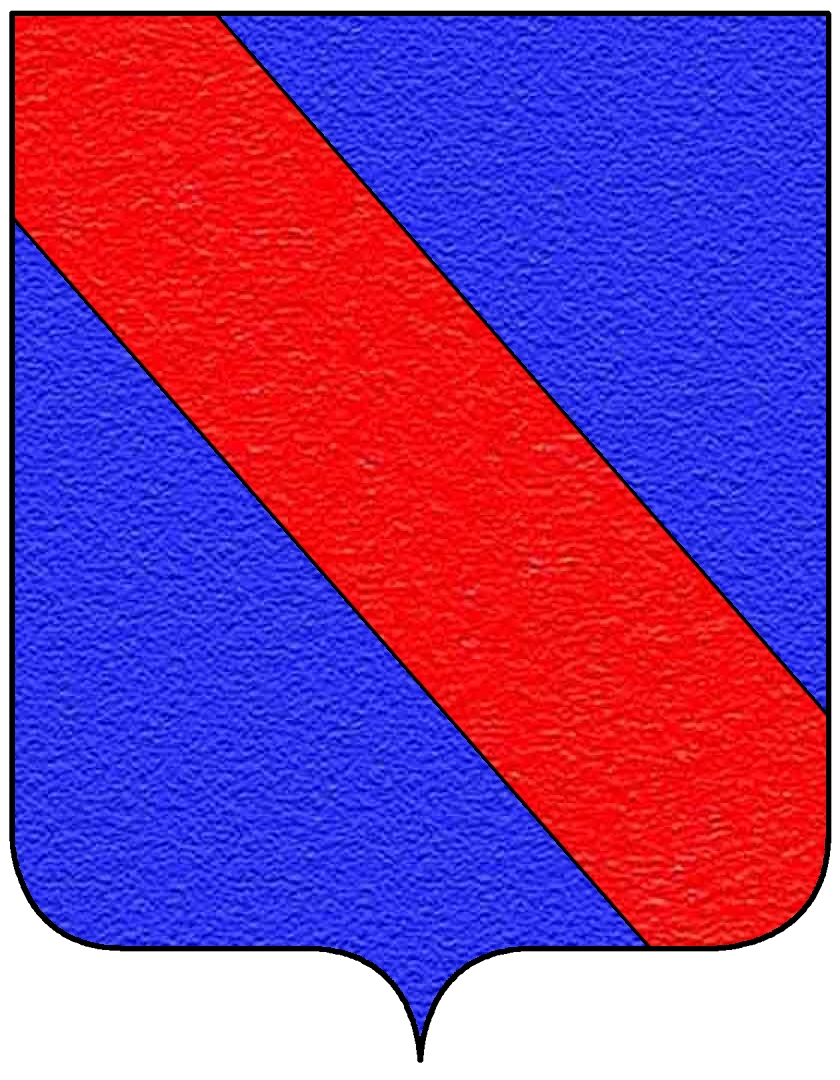
Coat of arms of the Kaboga family

The House of Kaboga (Kabužić in Croatian, Caboga in Italian) were a patrician family from the city of Dubrovnik and its Republic of Ragusa. Their numbers, economic power and social and political status marked them as wealthy, influential and noble. Originating in the eighth century, they are one of the oldest and best-known families in Dubrovnik. Many of its members were rector (knez) of the republic, and the Austrian Empire recognized its members in 1818 and 1833 as counts.

== History ==
The Kaboga family first appears during the late 13th century. Džore Dišić, who died before 1282, appears to be the patriarch although he is not specifically mentioned in sources. Džore Dišić's wife Draga and their sons, Mihajlo (Miho), the cleric Dživo, Marin and Vlaho, are frequently mentioned in records of the Dubrovnik chancellery for 1281 and 1282; Draga is described as "Uxor quondam Georgii de Disica", and her sons primarily as "filii qu. Džore Dišić". Mihajlo, Dživo and Marin have the name "Kaboga", and Mihajlo is described as the son of Džore Kaboga.

Vlaho is mentioned in the Dubrovnik chancellery books later, after the name of Kaboga replaced Dišić. In 1297, he is called Vlaho Džore Kaboga. Tomasina filia qu Džore Dišić, who married Palma Bisti Getaldić in 1283, appears again in 1325 in the will of Džono Kaboga; the Kaboga and Dišić families of 1281 and 1282 are seemingly identical, with Miho Džore Kaboga (1280–1286) apparently the oldest brother. In 1281, he received a portion of his father's estate. Marin, Dživo and Vlaho continued to live with their mother, and Marin cared for the family's business affairs. Miho described his brother Dživo as his procurator.

Three branches of the Kaboga family are descended from Miho, Marin and Vlaho, with all three cited in the second half of the 15th century. Marin's descendants, including his son Jure (1310–1368) and his grandson Nikola Jurov Kaboga (1348–1373), were involved in public life. Vlaho (1282–1333) had two sons, Dživo (1330–1340) and Mihael (1332–1366); he, Jure, Niko and Miše were members of the Vijeće Umoljenih. Nikola carried out diplomatic assignments; he visited the King of Hungary in 1360 and 1363, and participated in peace talks in Kotor in 1362. Before his death in 1373 he was a judge and four-term rector, and was influential during Dubrovnik's break with Venice.

Vlaho and his descendants were primarily grain traders; in 1292 he appears as a witness in Ancona, and in 1313 in Durrës. In 1329 oats were taken from him in Ulcinj and the following year, he and his son Dživo accepted a quantity of wheat from a Florentine company. Three months later, he received a credit of 450 perperas from the Florentines. His sons continued in the grain trade; Dživo and M. Cerva were sent to Constantinople in 1330 to purchase wheat. In September 1335, Dživo sold 670 stara ječma from the harvest to a merchant from Bar. At the end of October, he agreed to supply Dubrovnik with at least 500 stara of wheat by January or February. On January 28, 1336, Dživo delivered 673 stara of wheat. He was apparently not wealthy at first, investing small sums.

In 1335, Dživo and Orsat Cerva worked with Džono Giorgi, receiving half the profits and risking 20 percent each of the potential loss. Dživo Bona's brother, Petar (1318–1346), also bought wheat in 1326, 1339, 1340 and 1345.

Miho's third brother, Vlaho Kaboga (1322–1366), was sent by the government in June 1361 to Apulia to purchase wheat for his own use ("pro usu domus tue"); he was obligated to remain until March 1362. While he was there, the government sent him several purchase orders. In 1382, after his death, there was a quantity of salt in his basement.

During the military operations of the 1380s, Mihail's son Marin (1363–1409) supplied hardtack to the galleys and apparently dealt in oil, cheese and tallow candles (lojanica). In 1394, Marin lived in Venice; his second marriage was to Margarita Nikole Kaboga (1383–1423), daughter of his second cousin (drugi bratić, grandfather of Džore Marinov Kaboga). She and Marin had a son, Danijel. Beginning in 1397, Marin was chosen as rector several times. Mihael (Miho) Marin Kaboga (1397–1428) was Marin's son from his first marriage.

In 1350 Jure Kaboga received oil valued at 322 perpera from Romaldus de Bari, and in 1356 his son Nikola (1348–1373) delivered Albanian wheat to Džore Jače Giorgi. Several times he had to sue his debtors for large payments. Nikola Jure Kaboga was married for a second time to Dechussa, daughter of the Venetian Andrea Dulfina. Her mother, Rade, was a citizen of Dubrovnik; through her, she was related to the Menče, Giorgi and Gundula families. Rade may have been the daughter of Džono Damjan Gondola and Deje Medozi Drago from Kotor; if so, she had been married to Džono Sorgo. Many of Mihael's descendants died young. Džono Dživo Kaboga (1341–1363) and his wife, dealers in cloth and leather, died in 1363 during a plague and left a young son, Dživo Džono Kaboga.

Records of two sons of Dživo Džono Kaboga, Nikola and Luka (1396–1437), survive; Luka was born outside of marriage, and the brothers worked together. Their accounting records are the oldest documents of their time preserved in Dubrovnik.

== Austrian Kabogas ==
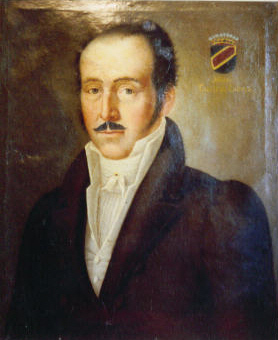
Henrik Kaboga

- Dživo Kaboga (1739–1814) had three children.
  - Frano Vlaho Marijan Martin Kaboga, born in 1781.
  - Brno Frano Marijan Kaboga (6 February 1785–19 November 1855) was married in 1833 to Countess Julianne Wanda Potocka (1788–18 September 1876, Lemberg), they had no children. Julianne's first husband was Count Cajetan Uruski.
  - Vlaho Filip Antun Dživo Frano Kaboga (25 May 1774–13 May 1854) married Marija Katarina de Saracca (died in Dubrovnik, 11 May 1864) in Dubrovnik on 26 October 1806. They had three children:
    - Henrik Nikola Bernard Kaboga (1 August 1818, Dubrovnik – 1 March 1881) was the Austrian consul in Jerusalem until his death. In 1867 he bought what was known as the Tower of Jacob and Ephrata at Tantur in Bethlehem, where the Hospice of the Order of Malta was opened in 1876. Henrik married Helena Ghetaldi on 10 June 1837 in Zadar. They had three children:
      - Marija Bernardina Ana Kaboga (20 November 1856–19 November 1938) married Albert Ritter Conti von Cedassamare (died 6 April 1900 in Trieste) on 4 June 1853. They had five children:
        - Marta Maria Conti von Cedassamare (born in Trieste on 1 February 1883)
        - Petar Marian Ritter Conti von Cedassamare (29 June 1884–6 April 1886)
        - Justus Marian Ritter Conti von Cedassamare (22 November 1885–26 March 1886)
        - Albert Ritter Conti von Cedassamare, also known as Albert Conti (Albert Maroje Vlaho Frano Marian), was born on 29 January 1887 in Görz and died on 18 January 1967 in Hollywood. A film actor, he studied law and natural science in Austria and was married to Patricia Cross.
        - Maria Concetta Conti von Cedassamare was born in Pula on December 5, 1892.
      - Ana Marija Enriketa Lujza Kaboga (20 June 1858 – 1944, Szombathely, Hungary) married Lucijan von Ziegler-Pucić (19 March 1852, Kotor – 8 September 1930, Dubrovnik) in Dubrovnik on 10 April 1882. They had three children:
        - Helena von Ziegler-Pučić (3 March 1889, Pula – 2 February 1968, Baden bei Wien) married Hugo Theobald Alfons Karl Maria Freiherr von Seyffertitz (23 September 1885, Brixen – 10 June 1966, Baden bei Wien).
        - Teo von Ziegler-Pucić, married Marica von Kiepach-Haselburg (born c. 1897 in Križevci, Croatia). After her husband's death, Marica moved to Los Angeles and died in 1985.
        - Marica von Ziegler-Pozza (10 January 1885, Pula – 2 February 1964, Acsád, Hungary) married Charley Masjon (19 November 1871, Graz – 1950, Táplánszentkereszt, Hungary). They had one daughter:
          - Winifred Masjon (8 June 1911, Pula – 14 December 1998, Keszthely) married László Harkay.
      - Bernard Vlaho Maroje Dživo Marijan Kaboga (21 April 1863, Dubrovnik – 10 May 1922, Waltendorf) married Marie Valerie Freiin von Locatelli (born 4 June 1870).
    - Dživo Bernard Frano Kaboga (4 April 1808 – 25 February 1871) married Wilhelmine von Privitzer, daughter of Alois von Privitzer, in October 1838 in Vienna. They had one daughter:
      - Maria Bernardina Cecilia Vilhemina Kaboga (born on 27 August 1839)

== Members ==
- Biagio Bernardo Caboga (fl. 1813–1814), led the Ragusan uprising against the French.
- Bernhard Caboga-Cerva (1785–1855), Austrian count and general

== Gallery ==
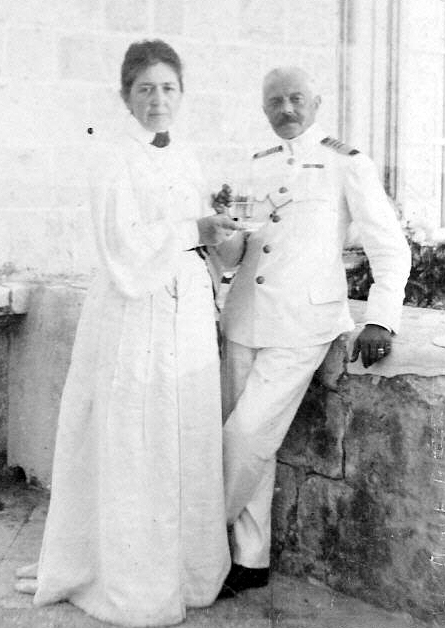
Ana Kaboga and Lucian v. Ziegler-Pozza

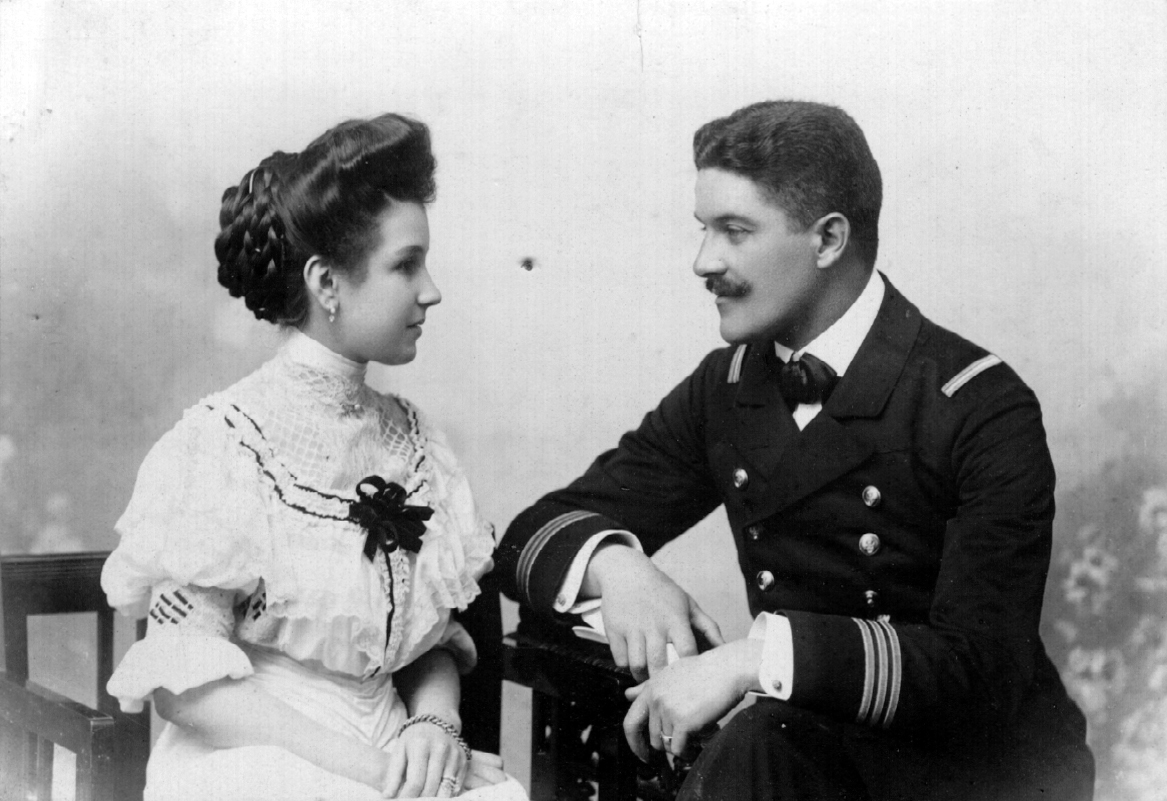
Marica and Charles Masjon, 1905

Helena v. Ziegler-Pozza

== Bibliography ==
- Heyer von Rosenfeld, Carl Georg – Der Adel des Königreichs Dalmatien, in Siebmacher Bd. IV, 3. Abteilung, Nürnberg 1873. Kaboga – Seite 6, 101, XXII, Tafel 3
- Stratowa – Wiener Genealogisches Taschenbuch, Kaboga, Band 2, Seite 96 (Namenserwähnung)
