= Ranjina =

Noble family of the Republic of Ragusa

Coat of arms of Ranjina family

The House of Ranjina, known as Ragnina in Italian, was a noble family in the Republic of Ragusa.

== History ==
The family traced its origins from Taranto, Italy.

== Members ==
- Nićifor Ranjina (fl. 1319), built the Minčeta Tower in 1319, originally as a strong four-sided fort.
- Nikša Ranjina (1494–1582), writer most famous as the compiler of Ranjina's Miscellany
- Dinko Ranjina (1536–1607), poet

== See also ==
- Croatian nobility
