= Benessa =

Noble family of the Republic of Ragusa

Coat of arms of Benessa family

The House of Benessa (in Latin and Italian, also known as Beneša or Benešić in Croatian) was a noble family of the Republic of Ragusa.

== History ==
In the beginning of the 15th century Ragusan nobility were present in Novo Brdo in the Serbian Despotate as merchants or mining lords; Benessa were also present.

== Notable members ==
- Damiano Benessa (Damianus Benessa or Damjan Beneša; 1477–1539), Humanist
- Pietro Benessa (Petrus or Petar Benessa)
- Andreas Benessa (or Andrija Beneša; fl. 1295–1301), notary
