= Palmotić =

Noble family of Dubrovnik

Palmotić Palmotta
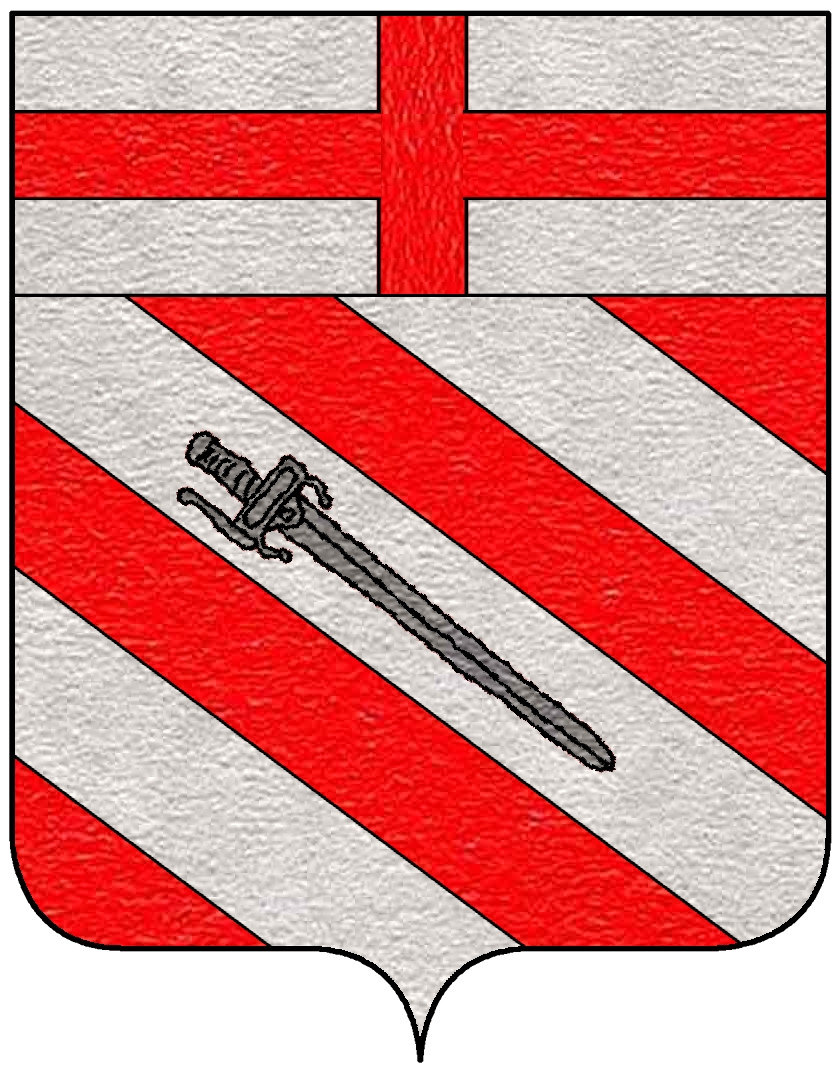
- Country: Republic of Ragusa (present-day Croatia)
- Founded: 1157 or 1222
- Current head: extinct
- Dissolution: 1709

The House of Palmotić known as Palmotta in Italian, was one of the oldest and most prominent families of the city of Dubrovnik. Many of its representatives were Rectors (Knezes) of the Republic of Ragusa, as well as members of the Small Council, Senate and Grand Council. Some of them were notable poets and playwrights.

== History ==
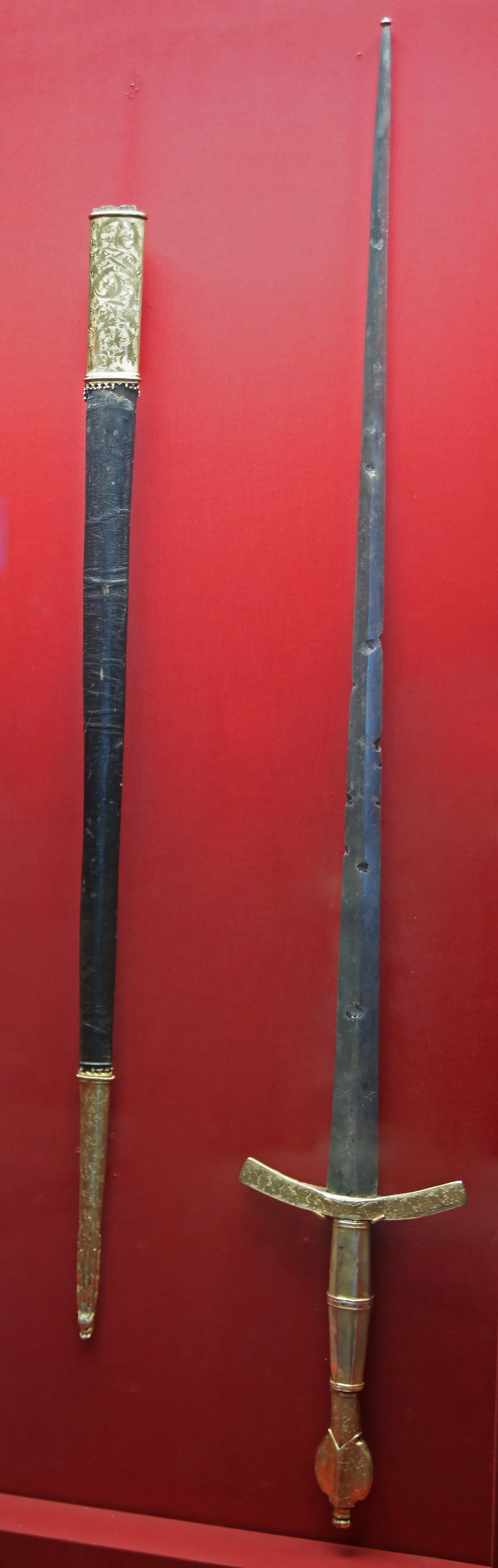
Ceremonial Rector's sword, a gift from the King Matija Korvin, brought to Dubrovnik in 1466 by Dživo Palmotić

The ancestors of the family originated most probably from the medieval principality of Zahumlje. The first mention of the Palmotta dates to 1222, although according to some sources they had been present in Dubrovnik before, already in the 12th century (1157). In the two-century-long period of time, from 1440 to 1640, there were in total 46 members of the family in the Grand Council (Consilium maius), a body consisting of all adult noblemen of the Republic. They were also 67 times elected to the Senate (Consilium rogatorum), 34 times to the Small Council (Consilium minus), and 42 times as Rectors (knez), the heads of the state.

In his description of Dubrovnik in the 15th century, Filip de Diversis, an Italian humanist born in Lucca, Tuscany, adduced that the Palmotić family was one of the only 33 remaining patrician families in the prosperous mercantile and maritime Republic. The process of extinction continued however onwards, so that there were merely 24 aristocratic families in Dubrovnik in the 17th century, including the Palmotićs. The family reached its peak at that time, for its members were distinguished diplomats, poets and playwrights.

Having been skilled diplomats, the members of the family performed ambassador duties at many European and non-European royal and imperial courts for centuries. One of them, Dživo (Ivan) Palmotić, was given the honour to bring a beautiful ceremonial sword, donated by King Matija Korvin (second half of the 15th century), personally from Buda to Rector's Palace in Dubrovnik. That is why a sword is a constituent part of the family coat of arms.

In the course of time, however, the process of extinction affected the House of Palmotić at the beginning of the 18th century. The remarkable Ragusan family became extinct as its last scion, Jelena Palmotić, died in 1709.

== Notable members ==
- Dživo Palmotić, diplomat, lived in the 15th century
- Ivan Nikolin Palmotić (died 1483), executed in 1483 by the Ottomans for treason after the fall of Herzegovina.
- Ivan Palmotić (c.1567 - 1647), politician
- Junije Palmotić (1606 or 1607–1657), famous Croatian baroque poet and playwright
- Džore Palmotić(1606–1675), poet and playwright
- Jaketa Gjonorić Palmotić (?–1680), politician and writer

== See also ==
- List of noble families of Croatia
- Ragusan nobility
