= Gradić family =

Patrician family in the Republic of Ragusa

Coat-of-arms of the House of Gradić.

The House of Gradi or Gradić was one of the oldest (from the 12th century) and one of the most recognized among the patrician families in the Republic of Ragusa. Many of its members were Rectors (Knez) of the Republic. The Austrian Empire recognized its long-standing nobility on 1 December 1817 after the fall of the Republic.

== Notable members ==
- Bazilije Gradić, bishop in Ston, author of the Croatian religious book from 1567, Libarze od dievstva i dievickoga bitya v komse tomace sua kolika poglauita miesta staroga i nouoga sakona, koia od dieustua gouore i ono scto sueti naucitegli u mnosieh librieh pisciu; Libarze velle duhovno i bogogliubno od molitve i contemplanya, sniekiem napomenam duhouniem, oniem ki xele duhouno xiuieti, uelle potrebno i korisno (printed in Venice, second edition in Rome in 1584)
- Nikola Mateo Gradić, married on 19 June 1774 to Tereza Zamanja. The same received 1 December 1817 one recognition of nobility, and left two sons:
  - Sebastian Marija Josip Gradić, born 15 July 1777
  - Mateo Gradić, born 22 August 1786, he married Ana Giorgi-Bona. They had one daughter Elena de Gradi, who married Matteo Niccolo Pozza and Nicola de Gradi, who married Magdalena de Pozza in 1854.
- Stjepan Gradić (1613–1683), philosopher and scientist
- Džive Gradić, mother of Ivan Gundulić
- Nikša Gradi (1825–1894), writer, politician and lawyer

== See also ==
- Republic of Ragusa
- Dubrovnik
- Dalmatia
- Post-Roman patriciates
