= Giorgi family =

Noble family of Venice and Ragusa

(de) Giorgi: de Georgiis; De Giorgi; Jurić; Đurđević; Georgi; Georgio; Zorzi; Žurgović
- Country: Republic of Ragusa; Republic of Venice
- Estates: Palazzo Giorgi, Dubrovnik
- Cadet branches: House of Giorgi-Bona; House of Giorgi-Pozza

The Giorgi or Zorzi were a noble family of the Republic of Venice and the Republic of Ragusa.

== History ==
Tradition links the Zorzi to the origins of the city of Venice. In 1817, Antonio Longo wrote that they came from Moravia and Silesia; entered Italy in 411 AD and took up residence at Pavia; and after the invasion of Attila in 453 AD were among the founders of Venice.

The Almanach de Gotha enumerates it among the eleven oldest native families of the Republic of Ragusa, and members of the family were still living in the city in the 19th century.

The first documented mention of the family dates from the tenth century: in 964 Gregorio di Andrea de Georgii was bishop of the island of San Pietro di Castello, formerly known as Olivolo, in the Venetian Lagoon.

It has been suggested that the Giorgi came to Ragusa either from Rome or from Kotor.

The island of Curzola has been a fiefdom of the family since 1254.

=== The Ragusan branches ===
Over the centuries, the Giorgi were divided into several branches in Italy and abroad, merging with other noble families of Dubrovnik and continental Europe. A branch of the family joined its name and arms to those of the Bona family, creating a new branch as Giorgi-Bona.

The Giorgi were among the important families of the Republic of Ragusa, serving in the 14th and 15th centuries in 6.50% of all major public offices. Between 1440 and 1640 the Giorgi had 109 members of the Great Council, representing 4.95% of the total. In the two hundred years, they also count for 203 senators (6.21%), 163 rectors of the Republic (6.84%), 173 representatives in the minor council (6.33%) and 41 guardians of justice (4.99%).

== People ==
Members of the family include:

- Marino di Matteo Zorzi (1231–1312), governor of the Republic of Ragusa, later Doge of Venice
- Niccolò di Francesco Zorzi (15th century), Venetian ambassador to Pope Martin V
- Marco di Bertucci Zorzi (mid-15th century), Venetian military commander and ambassador to France
- Giorgio di Giovanni Zorzi, born 1582, Venetian ambassador to France and Poland
- Pier Antonio Zorzi (1745–1803), 5th Archbishop of Udine, cardinal
- Ennio De Giorgi (1928–1996), Italian mathematician

The Ragusan poet Ignjat Đurđević (Ignazio Giorgi) did not belong to this family, but to another ennobled a few years before his birth in 1675.

== Gallery ==
Maria Giorgi-Pozza tomb, Dubrovnik

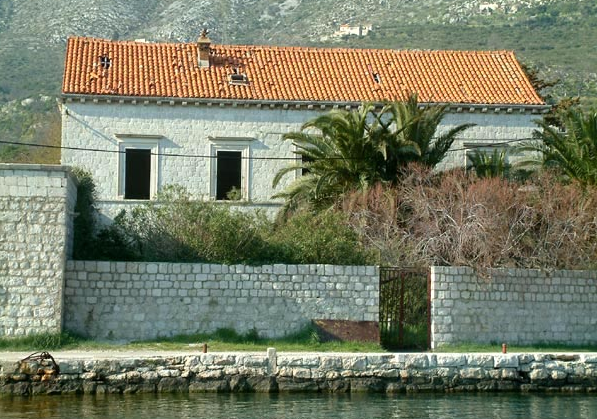
Palazzo Giorgi, Dubrovnik

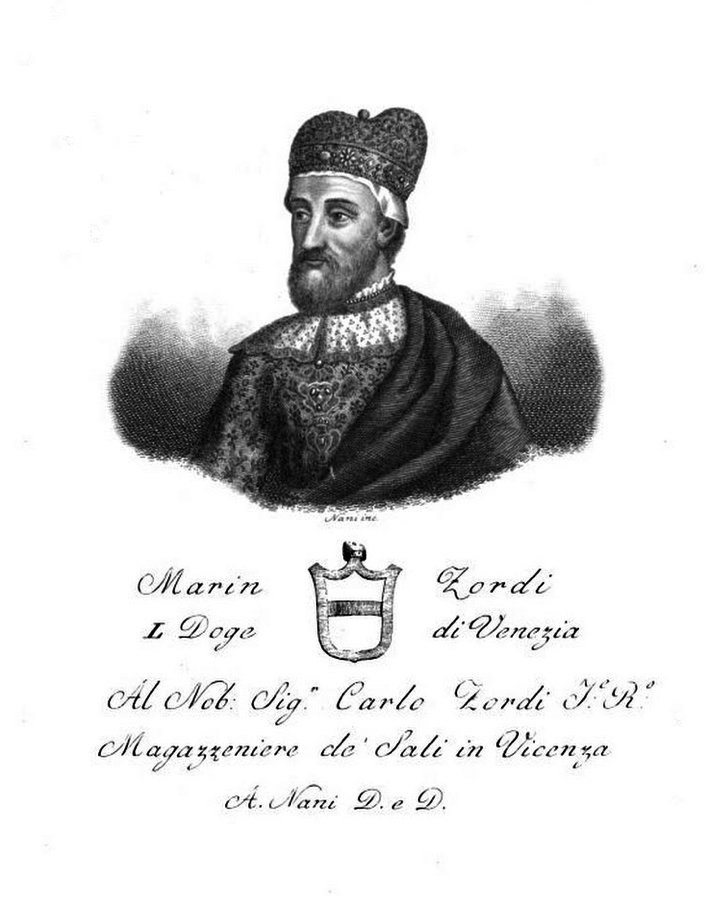
Nineteenth-century copper engraving of Marino Zorzi

Various coats-of-arms of the family. The last one is the branch of House of Bona-Giorgi.

== See also ==
- Zorzi
- List of people from Dubrovnik
