= Novo Brdo Fortress =

Medieval Serbian fortress located in Kosovo

- Novo Brdo, Kosovo
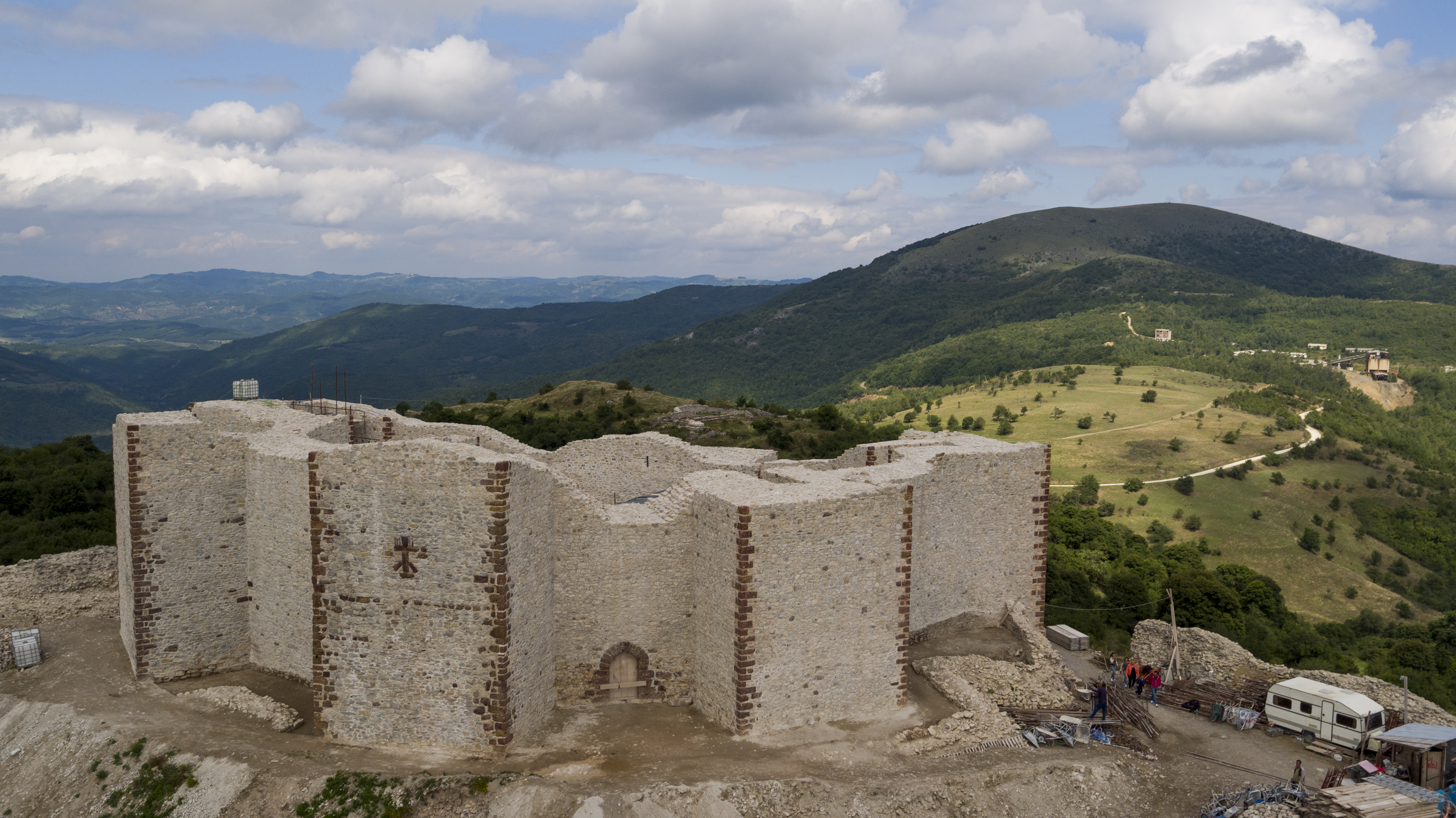
- Upper town of Novo Brdo Fortress

Site information
- Type: fortification
- Condition: Ruins

Location
- Coordinates: 42°36′54″N 21°25′02″E
- Height: 13 metres (43 ft)

Site history
- Built: c. 1285
- Built by: Stephen Uroš II Milutin of Serbia
- In use: 1285–1687
- Materials: Stone, limestone and breccia
- Battles/wars: Sieges: 1412–13, 1427, 1429, 1439, 1440–41, 1455, 1686, 1690
- Events: Ratification of Mining Law in 1412; Fall of the Serbian Empire; Great Turkish War

Novo Brdo Fortress (Albanian: Kalaja e Novobërdës, Kalaja e Artanës; Serbian: Тврђава Ново Брдо, Tvrđava Novo Brdo) is a medieval Serbian fortress in Kosovo. Its ruins are located near the town of Novo Brdo, about 40 kilometres (25 mi) east of Pristina. The fortress was built in the late 13th century by king Stephen Uroš II Milutin of Serbia to protect gold, silver, iron and lead mines which were abundant throughout the area. Novo Brdo was famous for its silver. Together with the castles of Prizren, 12 kilometres (7.5 mi) to the southwest, and Prilepac, 13 kilometres (8.1 mi) to the southeast, which guard access roads to the fortress, Novo Brdo helped form a defensive complex overlooking the lucrative mining operations. Novo Brdo was at its height during the Serbian Despotate (1402–1459), when it was the most important mining area and second most important town in Serbia. A significant number of Saxon miners, Albanian Catholics and a large Ragusan merchant colony lived within the town, which was ruled by a vojvoda, but also a governor (kefalija), because it was the seat of an administrative unit of the Despotate.

Systematic archaeological research of the site began in 1952. In 1948, during the Yugoslav era, the fortress of Novo Brdo was declared a Monument of Culture of Exceptional Importance. When Kosovo declared its independence in 2008 it was temporarily designated as a special protective site and since 2014 is on the database of protected cultural heritage of the Ministry of Culture of Kosovo.

== Etymology ==
Novo Brdo means New Hill in Serbian. Other names for Novo Brdo in written sources are either translations or are derived from the Serbian name. Some of them are: Nowobordo, Nowebordo, Novus Mons, Novomonte, Monte Novo, Nyeberghe, Novaberde, Νοβόπριδον.

== Layout ==
Novo Brdo Fortress consists of two parts: the Upper Town and the Lower Town. It is composed of eight rectangular towers (six in the Upper Town and two in the Lower Town), three gates (one in the Upper Town and two in the Lower Town), and a large dry moat around most of the walls (from the north point of Upper Town to the north point of Lower Town to the south point of Lower Town). Upper Town has an irregular hexagonal shape. Lower Town fans out toward the west down the slope of the hill. The dry moat wraps around the fortress from the west to the north. There is a source of drinking water inside the fortress. Vast suburbs (Serbian: Подграђе) outside the city walls expand to the east and southeast. Settlements of Sass miners and merchant colonies of traders from Dubrovnik were located in the suburbs, as well as merchants from the Italian city-states, especially Venice.

=== Upper town ===
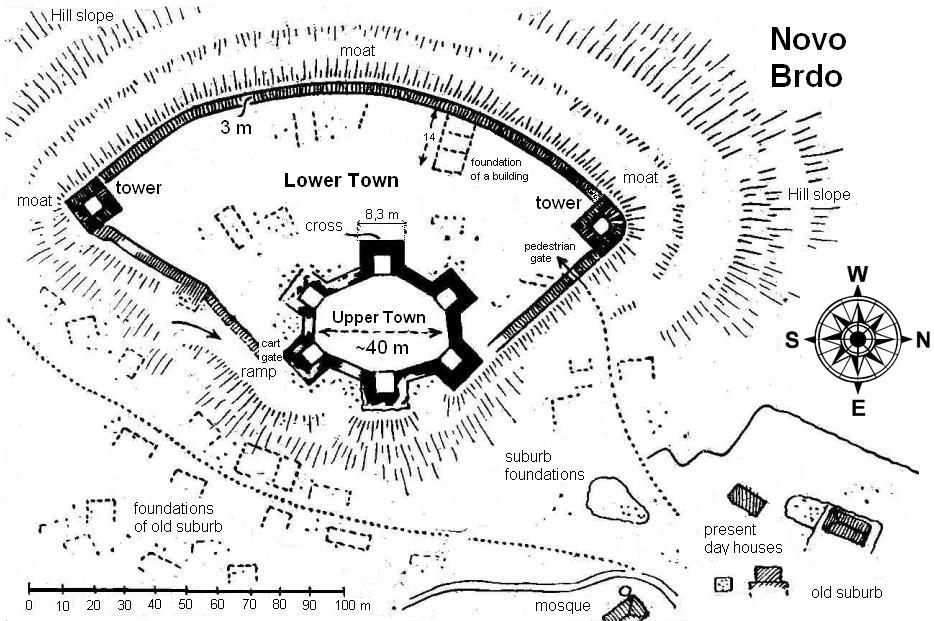
Layout of Novo Brdo Fortress

The Upper Town is the citadel of Novo Brdo and has a nearly regular hexagonal shape that is flattened on the east, so it almost takes on the look of a pentagon with the flat side facing outward toward the direction that is most approachable. In the middle of the flattened portion is the large rectangular four-sided donjon tower. Opposite the donjon in the western vertex is a three-sided tower, its curved side adorned with a cross in dark red brick facing the Lower Town and the west. In each of the remaining vertices are square towers. The entrance to the Upper Town was through a pedestrian gate in the rampart between the tower with the cross and the tower to the south of it. The length of Upper Town (in the north–south direction) is 50 metres (160 ft), while its width is 45 metres (148 ft).

=== Lower town ===
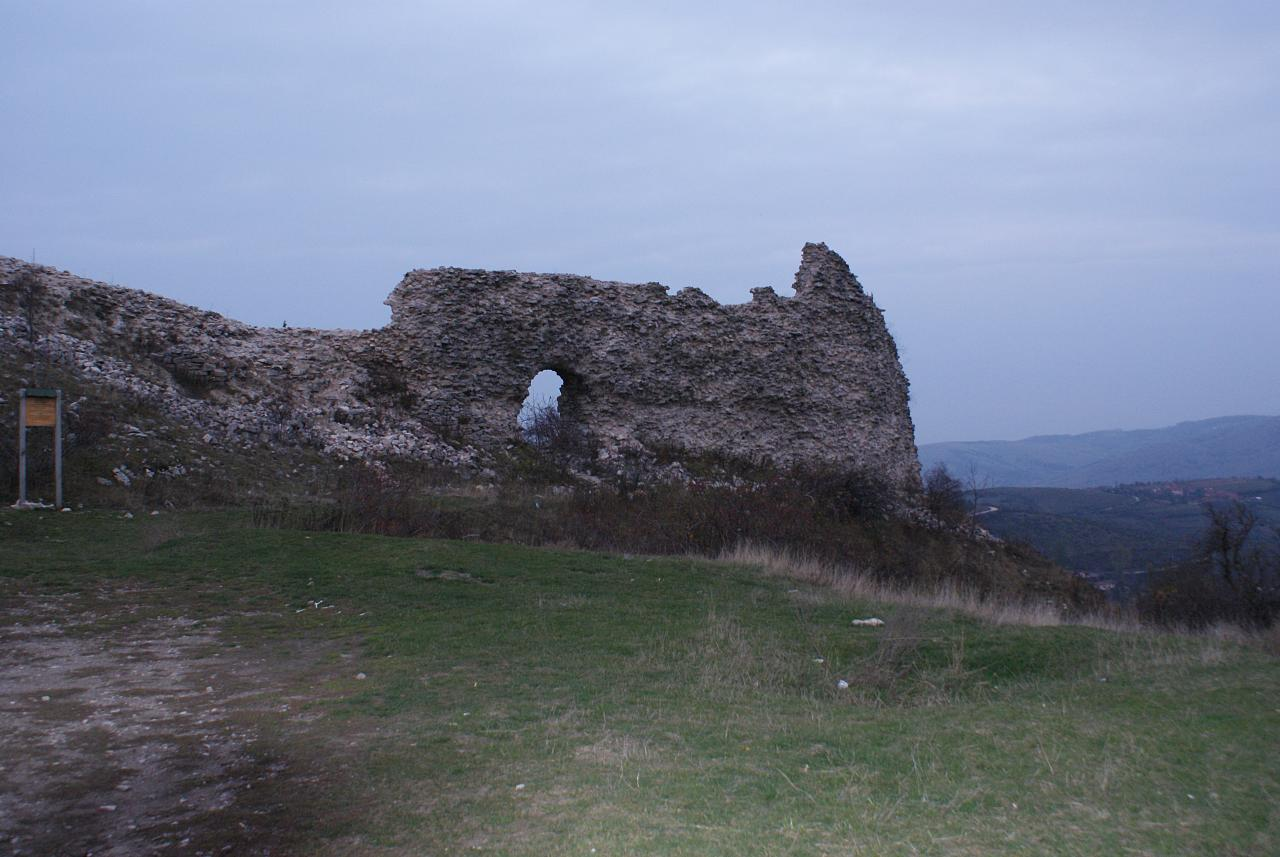
The ruins of the fortress of Novo Brdo

Lower Town is a fortified settlement of Novo Brdo in the shape of an elongated rectangle (180 m x 95 m, of which 45 m belong to Upper Town) with flattened sides (at the east and west). Lower Town consists of only two complete vertices (each with a tower), while the remaining two vertices are actually arched ramparts (west) and Upper Town (East). The main entrance to the Lower Town is the great cart gate with a ramp, which is located in the southeast rampart alongside the south tower of the Upper Town. In the north wall near the north tower of the Lower Town is a pedestrian gate which was used for sallies during the siege.

=== Towers ===
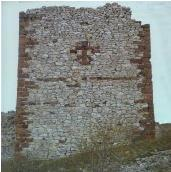
Tower with a cross

Novo Brdo has eight towers – six in the Upper Town and two in the Lower Town:

- A rectangular tower at the eastern vertex of the Upper Town, the donjon of the fortress;
- A three-sided square tower at the northern vertex of the Upper Town, from which starts the northeast rampart of the Lower Town;
- A three-sided square tower at the northwestern vertex of the Upper Town;
- A three-sided rectangular tower at the western vertex of the Upper Town decorated with a cross made of dark red stone with an inscription – I-H К (А) – made of brick;
- A three-sided square tower at the southwestern vertex of the Upper Town;
- A three-sided square tower at the southern vertex of the Upper Town;
- A polygonal triangular tower at the northern vertex of the Lower Town; and
- A polygonal triangular tower at the southern vertex of the Lower Town decorated with three rose windows. The first window, with a diameter of 70 cm, is on the south side of the tower close to the eastern rim in the upper part of tower – it is very similar to the western rose window of the Ravanica monastery. Two additional windows are on the east side of the tower and are slightly smaller than the first; these windows resemble the rose window in the Ljubostinja monastery (north facade, western part, near the side apse).

=== Gates ===
Novo Brdo has three gates, one in the Upper Town and two in the Lower Town:

- The arched pedestrian gate located in the western rampart of the Upper Town between the west tower with the cross and the southwest tower;
- The great cart gate with a ramp located alongside the south tower of the Upper Town; and
- The arched sally port located in the northeast rampart of the Lower Town near the north tower.

== Religion ==
Within the mining settlement of Novo Brdo there are seven Eastern Orthodox churches and two Roman Catholic churches, the most important being:

- the Eastern Orthodox church of Saint Nicholas, which acted as the main church for the town, used by Orthodox Serbs.
- Roman Catholic church, referred to as Santa Maria de Nuovomonte in Dogni Targ (Saint Mary of Novo Brdo in Lower Square), also known as Sass's church, used by Sass miners and merchants from Dubrovnik (today located in the village of Bostan).
- The "Church of the Saxons", another Catholic church, dedicated to Saint Nicholas.

Religious life in medieval Novo Brdo was characterized by the coexistence of Eastern Orthodox and Roman Catholic communities. Novo Brdo was one of the primarily Catholic settlements of Serbian Despotate. Albanian Roman Catholics, Ragusan merchants, and Saxon miners formed the bulk of the Catholic community of Novo Brdo. In the local registers, names of various priests that served the community have survived, such as the Albanian Ginus filius Georgii de Nouaberda and the Ragusan Pasko Bobaljević eanonieus Ragusii et plebanus Novi Montis.

== Life in medieval Novo Brdo ==
Imagined appearance of the Fortress in the middle of the 14th century

Novo Brdo was a scattered town, a huge mining settlement, and a suburb of Novo Brdo. The square (mercatum or burgus), the heart of social life, was located here. It had its own statute (law), at least since 1439. Due to large amounts of high-quality silver, trade ties of Novo Brdo extended far beyond the Balkan peninsula, especially to the west across the Adriatic Sea to Italy and beyond. Suburbs extended to the rivers Kriva reka (which was known as Topolnica at the time) and Prilepnica. The approach to Novo Brdo was defended by castles in Prizrenac and Prilepac. Contemporary sources also mention the existence of a hospital owned by the Catholic church.

The mining work force consisting mainly of Sass valturci or rupnici (miners). Lively trade was conducted in the square, mostly by merchants from Dubrovnik and Venice, but also by Sass purgar (citizens). Sass had its own civil court, notaries, urburare (accountants that took care of mining tithe), and church. The Novo Brdo miners were so famous in Europe for their advanced skills that in the 14th and 15th centuries they were invited to move to and work in Italy and Spain.

Ragusan documents attest to the presence of a significant number of Albanians living in Novo Brdo throughout the 14th and early 15th centuries, including members of the Catholic Albanian clergy with names such as Gjergjash and Gjinko, Gjini, son of Gjergji, the presbyter (1382); the reverend Gjergj Gega, Nikollë Tanushi, Gjergj Andrea Pellini and Nikolla Progonovic. In the book of debtors belonging to Ragusan merchant Mihail Lukarevic, who resided in Novobërda during the 1430s, 150 Albanian household heads were mentioned as living in Novo Brdo with their families. They worked as miners, artisans and specialists in the mines of Novo Brdo. The anthroponomy of these figures is characteristically Albanian; distinctive Albanian names such as Gjon, Gjin, Tanush, Progon, Lek, Gjergj and Bibë are mentioned. Some families had a mixed Slav-Albanian anthroponomy - that is to say, a Slavic first name and an Albanian last name, or last names with Albanian patronyms and Slavic suffixes such as Gjonoviç, Gjinoviq, Progonoviq, Bushatoviq, Dodishiq, Kondiq, Lekiq and other such names. Many Albanian Catholic priests were registered as residing in Novo Brdo, as well as in towns like Janjevo, Trepça, Prizren and others.

Novo Brdo mines in the 15th century were especially known for the production of glam silver (argentum de glama), a type of silver containing up to 33% gold. Merchants of Dubrovnik sought to purchase this ore at the price of ordinary silver, then refine the gold themselves, and gain enormous profits. According historical estimates, the mines of Novo Brdo produced up to 6 tonnes of silver annually.

When the Nemanjić dynasty first took control of the area in the 12th century, settlements were built on hilltops and in strong defensive positions against attacks by rivals or local peasants – but when the Ottomans took control of the area in the 15th century there was less need for this and towns developed in the valleys instead.

The small steam bath located in the castle is considered to be unique in the history of Serbian medieval architecture.

== History ==
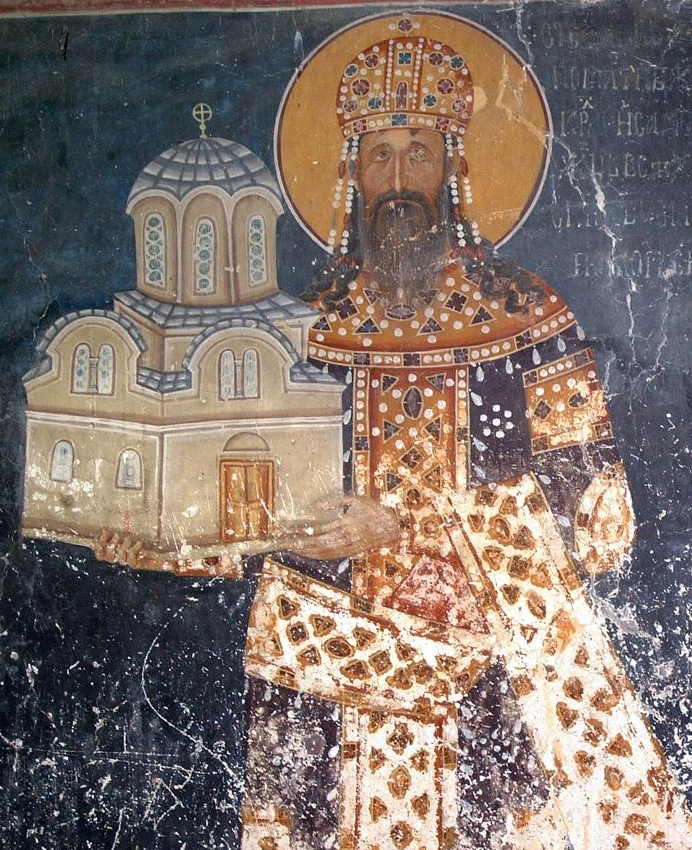
Fortress was built by Stefan Milutin, King of Serbia

Significant mining activity in Novo Brdo began in the first half of the 13th century during the reign of Serbian King Stefan Vladislav (r. 1233–1243), who had brought Saxon miners ("Sasi") to Serbia and developed mines. The fortress of Novo Brdo was created during the early years of the reign of king Stephen Uroš II Milutin of Serbia (r. 1282–1321) and became one of the most important settlements of Sass miners (they called Novo Brdo Nyeuberghe). Novo Brdo was also known as the Place of the Sasi (Serbian: Сашко место).

Novo Brdo appears in historical records in 1325, already renowned as a mining and trading center in which Ragusan traders conducted trade and had a customs office and a consul. In a letter from that year, King Stefan of Dečani informed the government of the Republic of Ragusa that the lease for the use of the Novo Brdo mine had been paid in full by Ragusan merchants.

Silver coins (grossi di Novaberda) carrying the insignia "Nouomonte moneta argentea" were made in Novo Brdo beginning in 1349 by Prince Lazar Hrebeljanović (r. 1373–1389). Novo Brdo's glam silver (argentum de glama) was much sought after by Ragusan traders. The significance of Novo Brdo is further documented by the number of late medieval luxury goods findings, which speak about its prosperity and high status.

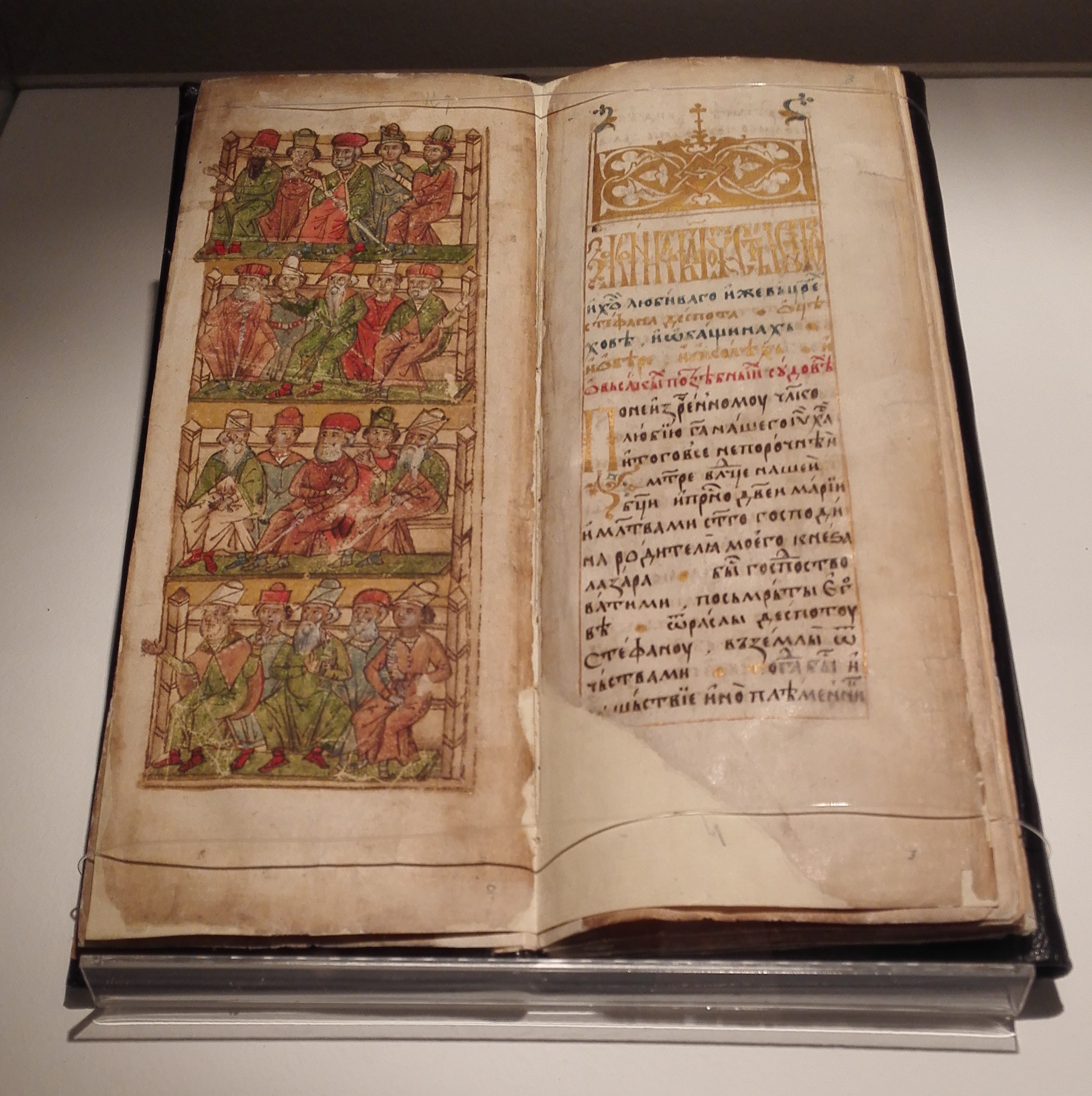
Mining Code (1412) of Stefan Lazarević

Serbian rulers had a custom of donating a certain amount of silver from Novo Brdo to various monasteries: Prince Lazar to Ravanica and Drenča, Despot Stefan Lazarević (r. 1389–1427) to Hilandar and Great Lavra, and Despot Đurađ Branković (r. 1427–1456) to Esphigmenou. In 1405, Despot Stefan donated an annual income of 100 pounds of silver from Novo Brdo to the Hilandar monastery. The law of the city of Novo Brdo is mentioned in 1439, which indicated that Novo Brdo in the 15th century was organized as a city municipality. Production of silver and gold peaked between 1420 and 1440.

The Ottoman Empire tried to capture Novo Brdo in 1412, but after a long siege they were forced to retreat. They then shifted their activity in Novo Brdo to intercepting caravans from Ragusa, attempting to deny them access to the town, but the town remained mainly undisturbed. Despot Stefan Lazarević ratified a set of laws on mining, the Sasi community, and exploitation of the mines in 1412. An archery tournament was held in 1413. After the first collapse of the Serbian Despotate in 1439, the Ottomans began a long siege of the fort, which ended with surrender of the Serbian defenders on 27 June 1441. Although the rest of Serbia was under Ottoman occupation for more than a year, during the two-year siege the residents of Novo Brdo stubbornly defended and even launched two attacks to repel the Ottomans, but were unsuccessful and lost the battles of Gračanica on 6 August 1439 and Makreš in 1440. In the first half of 1441, the Ottomans managed to take the suburbs of Novo Brdo. The town's defenders continued to resist until the end of June, when they surrendered. The Ottomans then plundered and burnt the town.

After a successful crusade in 1443–44, which penetrated all the way to Sofia and led to the restoration of the Serbian Despotate under the terms of the Szeged peace treaty, Novo Brdo was returned without a fight to Despot Đurađ Branković. Under Đurađ's vassal obligations towards the Ottoman sultan, a detachment of cavalry and a company of tunnel diggers from Novo Brdo were sent to Mehmet II (1451–1481) to aid in his attack on Constantinople, which ended on 29 May 1453 with the city's fall. According to the account of Bertrandon de la Broquière written in 1433, Đurađ was receiving 200,000 ducats out of Novo Brdo annually, while Novo Brdo mines were the most prosperous in the whole Balkan peninsula. At the time, annual income from the town was around 120,000 ducats. In 1454 the great voivode of Novo Brdo was Alessio Spani, a son of Peter Spani of the noble Albanian Spani family. Alessio's father Petar was also voivode of Novo Brdo under Stefan Lazarević.

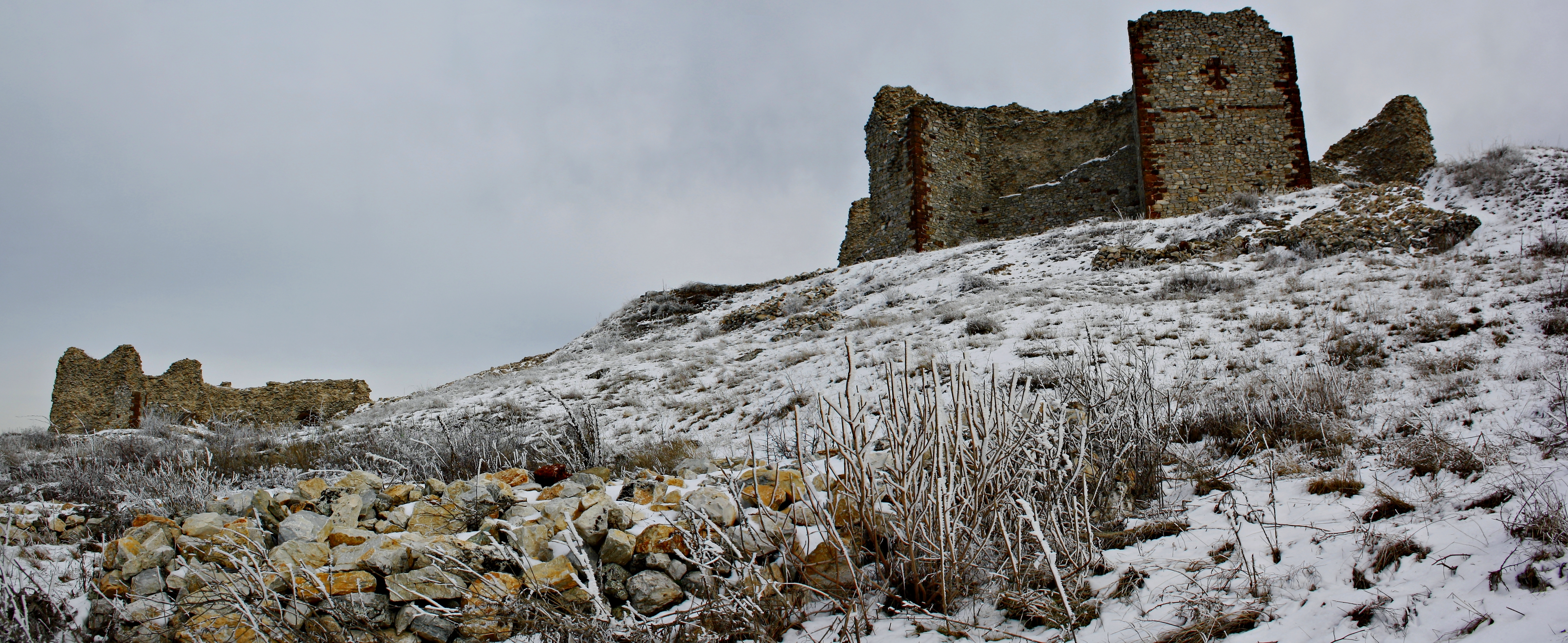
Fortress during winter

In 1455, the Ottomans attacked Novo Brdo again, and with the use of heavy artillery, forced the besieged to surrender on 1 June 1455. Under the orders of Sultan Mehmed II, all men of any distinguished rank or importance were decapitated. An estimated 320 boys were taken to become janissaries (devşirme). Approximately 700 girls and young women were taken to serve as the wives of Ottoman soldiers and their commanders. The siege and its aftermath were described in Memoirs of a Janissary, written in 1490—1501 by Novo Brdo resident Konstantin Mihailović, who was one of the boys taken.

Exploitation of the surrounding mines continued under the Ottomans, though operations were significantly diminished due to the lack of a professional work force and deteriorating conditions that had caused a steep decline of the town since 1455. According to defters for 1477 and for the period from 19 August 1498 to 7–8 August 1499, Novo Brdo was a completely Christian town, without a single Muslim, and contained 887 homes in total, out of which 78 were new. Of the approximately 5,000 inhabitants, 73 were miners and craftsmen. A defter for the Vučitrn sanjak, dated 4 January 1526, registered 514 homes, of which 139 were Muslim.

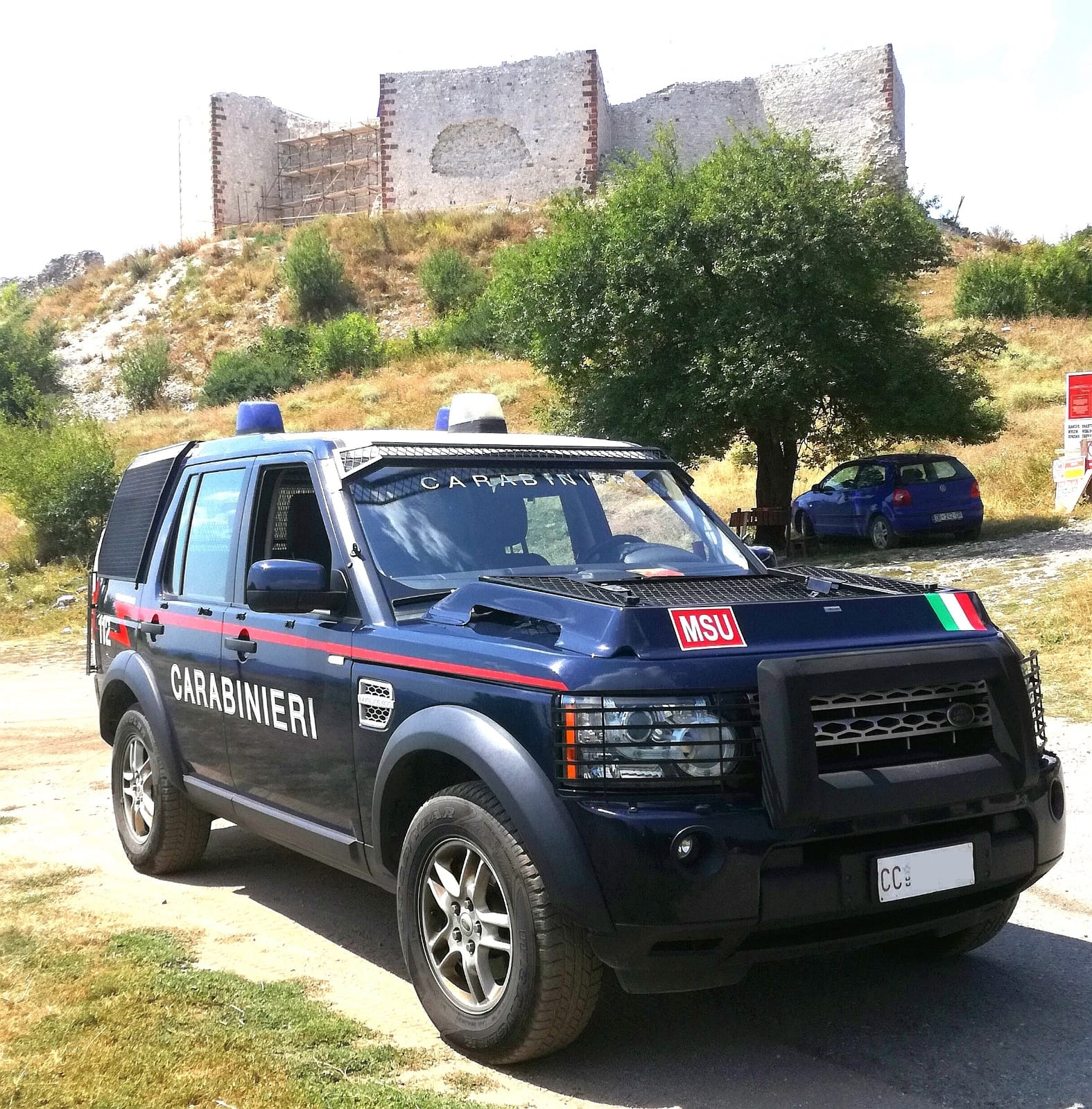
KFOR MSU patrol vehicle, in front of the fortress, checking the area to deter illegal activities on the site (2019).

From the 17th century, mintage was renewed in the fortress during the reign of sultan Murad IV (1623–1640), but was stopped in 1651. At the time there were only 18 Roman Catholic homes with 70 Roman Catholics left, and both Roman Catholic churches were so damaged that the priest held mass in one of the houses. In 1685, there were only 10 houses left in the fortress, which was so ruined by then that the 40 janissaries of the garrison were stationed in suburbs, which contained only 150 Christian and Muslim homes.

During the Great Turkish War, with the help of local Serbian rebels, general Enea Silvio Piccolomini occupied Novo Brdo in 1686, only a year after it was abandoned. Albanian insurgents participated in the battle fought between the Austrian military unit commanded by Kutschenbach against the Ottomans in Novo Brdo on March 17, 1690, a battle won by the Austrians.

In 1690–91, under the leadership of the Serbian Patriarch Arsenije III Čarnojević (1672–1706), the local Serbs moved to the Habsburg monarchy during the Great Serb Migration. The Ottomans reclaimed the fortress later that year, killing the entire Austrian garrison that had been left behind by Piccolomini. Afterwards, the exploitation of Novo Brdo mines and the use of the nearby fortress and adjoining settlements ceased. The fortress suffered significant damage in 1892, when the Ottomans used its well-made stones to build barracks in Pristina.

Systematic archaeological research of the site started in 1952 by the Archaeological Institute of the Serbian Academy of Sciences and Arts. In 1957, the National Museum of Serbia joined the research. Endeavors resulted in a number of multidisciplinary studies. Research was discontinued in 1999, due to the NATO bombing of Yugoslavia. Amateur excavations, treasure hunting, plundering, and illegal diggings, almost constant since 1999, continue to deteriorate the site. In one of those instances, in 2014, four Polish UNMIK police officers were searching for illegal diggings.

== See also ==
- List of fortresses in Kosovo

== Sources ==
- Дероко, Александар (1950). Средњевековни градови у Србији, Црној Гори и Македонији (in Serbian). Београд. pp. 170–173.
- Иван Здравковић, „Средњовековни градови и дворци на Косову“, Београд, 1975. (in Serbian)
- Радојчић, Никола (1962). Закон о рудницима деспота Стефана Лазаревића (in Serbian). Српска академија наука и уметности, Научно дело, Београд.
- Бошковић, Ђурђе (1939). Ново брдо. Бановинска штампарија, Скопље.; Đurđe Bošković, "La Forteresse Novo Brdo", Skoplje, 1939. (in Serbian and French)
- Kostić, Kosta (1922). Naši novi gradovi na jugu – Novo Brdo (in Serbian). Srpska književna zadruga, Beograd.
