= Croatian Renaissance =

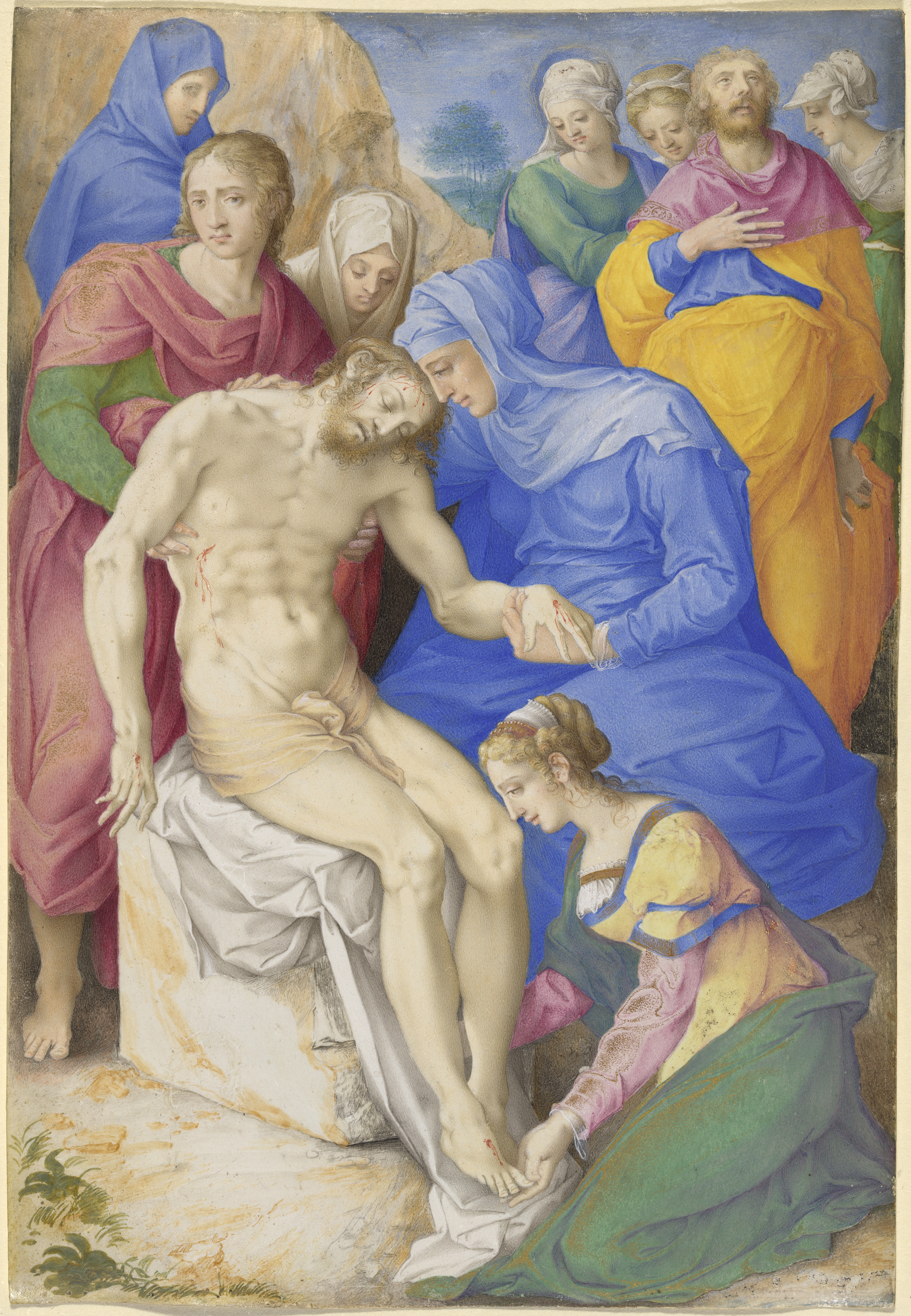
Juraj Klović; The Lamentation, c. 1550, National Gallery of Art, Washington D.C.

The Croatian Renaissance is a period of cultural enrichment in Croatia that began at the middle of the 15th century and lasted until the end of the 16th century, with high European movement of Renaissance.

== Culture ==
=== Introduction ===
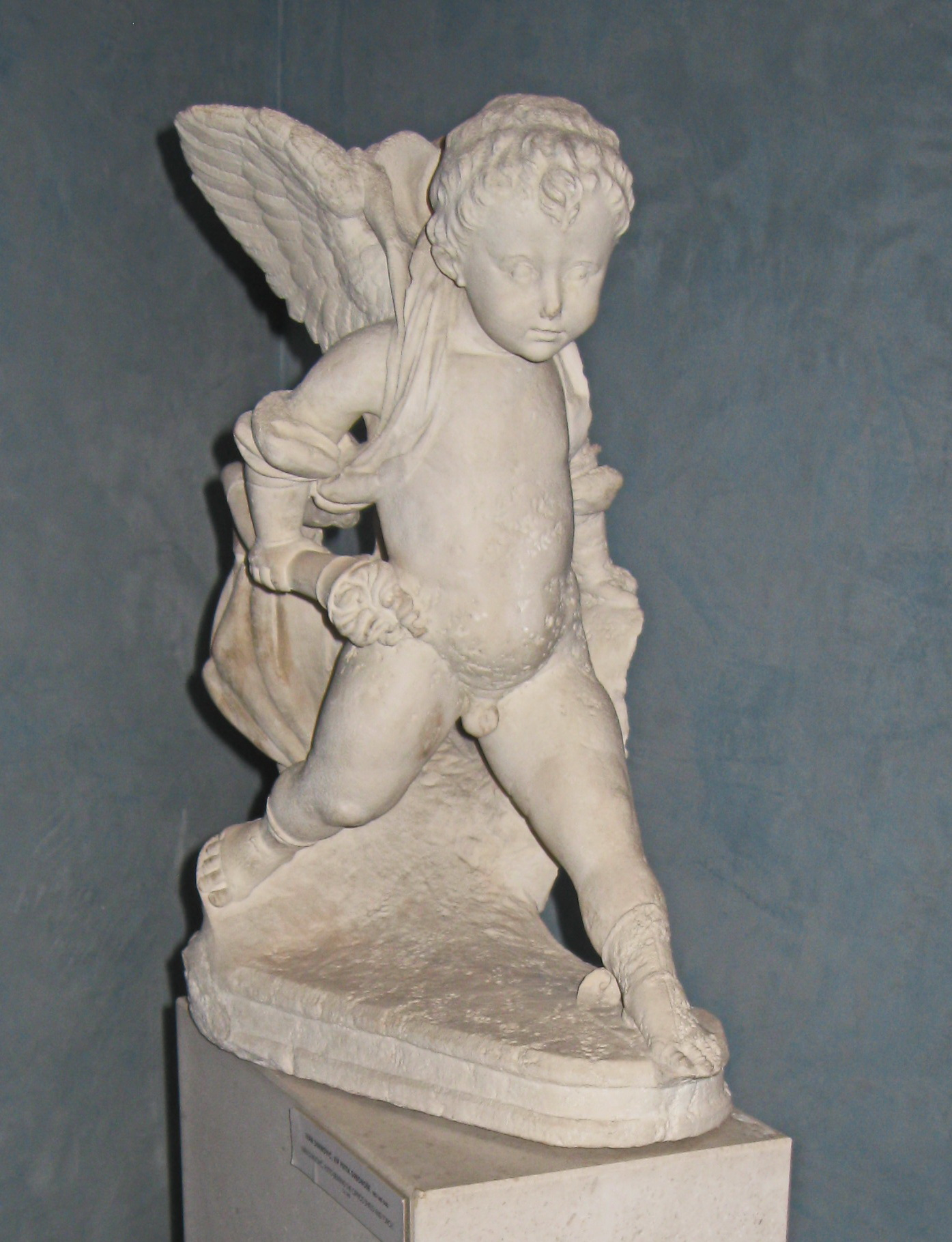
Ivan Duknović, Putto bearing the Cippico shield and torch, circa 1480. Trogir City Museum.

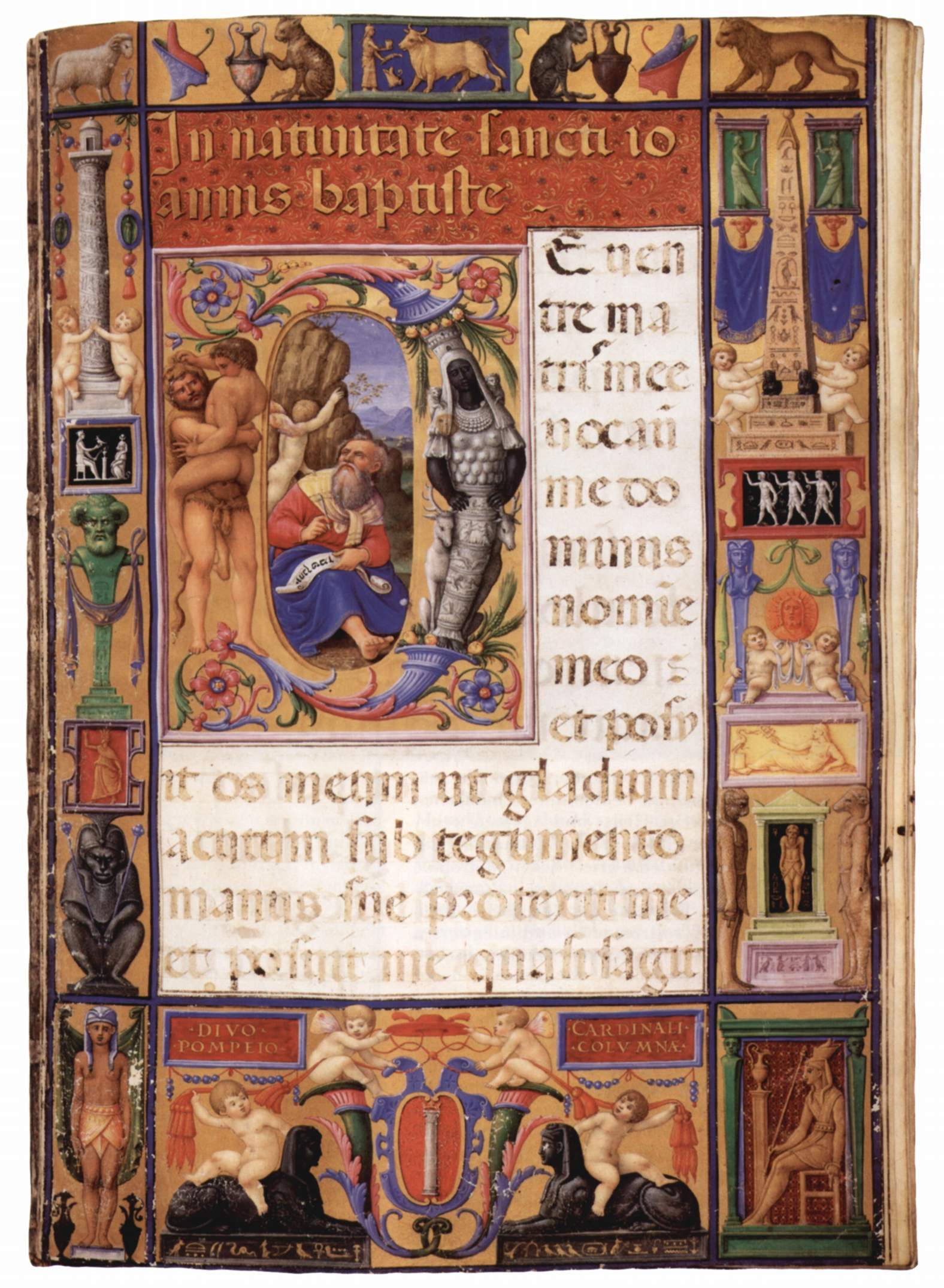
An illuminated page from Juraj Klović's Colonna hours, John Rylands Library, Manchester.

In the 15th century, Croatia had been in a personal union with Kingdom of Hungary since 1102 and Dalmatian city-states were under the rule of the Venetian Republic (with the exception of Dubrovnik). Later the Habsburgs gained control over the Croatian crown in the early 16th century and more territories came under Ottoman occupation. Dalmatia was on the periphery of several influences, just as far from Italy as from the Ottomans in Bosnia and Austrians in the north, so it benefited from all of these. In such circumstances Dalmatian religious and public architecture flourished, with clear influences from the Italian Renaissance.

Renaissance appeared on Adriatic shores of today's Croatia earlier than in other parts of Europe because of several reasons. One of them was the closeness of Italian renaissance centers, mostly Venetia, but also the high mobility of artists coming from Dalmatia who studied, travelled and worked in a large part of Europe that bordered the Ottoman Empire. For example, one of the most important early sculptors from Dalmatia, Ivan Duknović, before he ended working in Rome, spent some part of his life working for court of Matthias Corvinus in Buda, and in Zagreb and Dalmatia, where he left some remarkable artworks. Franjo Vranjanin from Zadar in Dalmatia spent his mature career at the other end of Italy, moving between Naples and Sicily, and Urbino, and finally in southern France, where he died. Young artist Juraj Klović, went through Venice towards the political center of Croatia – Buda, where he worked at the royal court, as Giorgio Vasari mentioned, before he returned to Italy. Politically as well, Croatia was also very suitable for Renaissance to appear and flourish. Namely, there are many glorious Roman and even Greek monuments preserved there and important artworks discovered and collected. Several cities and towns celebrated their limited independence by publishing constitutions in which they organized communal republican rule, of which Dubrovnik was the strongest one. Finally, many local nobles and influential families who not only collected antiquities but also sponsored high production of art. Most notable ones were family Cippico from Trogir and Petar Hektorović from Hvar, but also many others who were, for example, immortalized by famous renaissance painters, like Vjekoslav Gučetić by Titian, Toma Niger by Lorenzo Lotto, Petar Hektorović by Tintoretto or Bonino de Boninis, famous typographer, by Francesco Bissolo. Many intellectuals from Croatia, like Feliks Petančić from Dubrovnik, have studied in European centers like Padua, Bologna and Paris. Amongst them appeared some poets, writers and philosophers, of which some have become one of the most important European authors, like Marin Držić.

=== Art ===
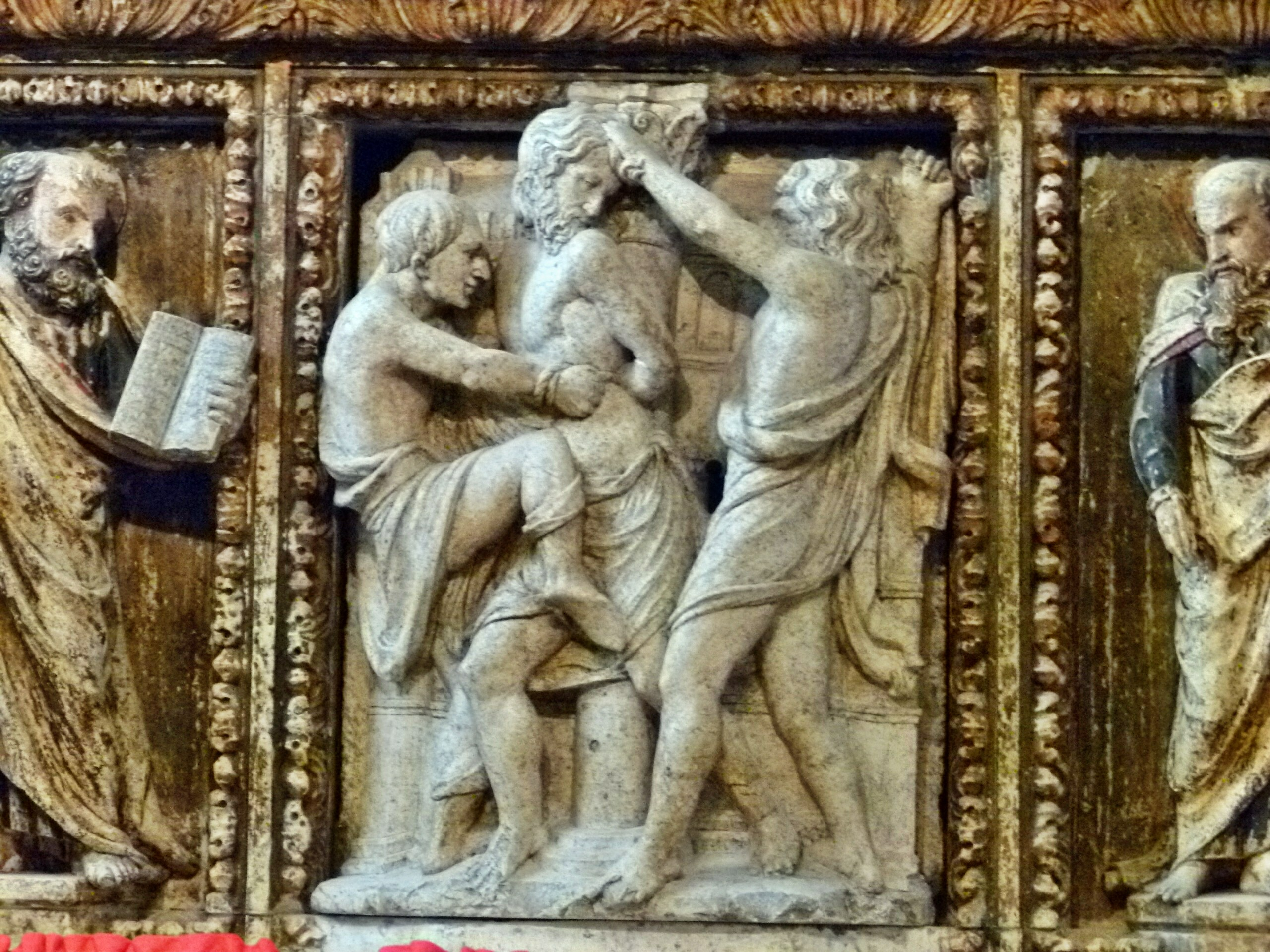
Flagellation of Christ (1428) by Juraj Dalmatinac, Split Cathedral, is an earliest example of Renaissance in Croatia.

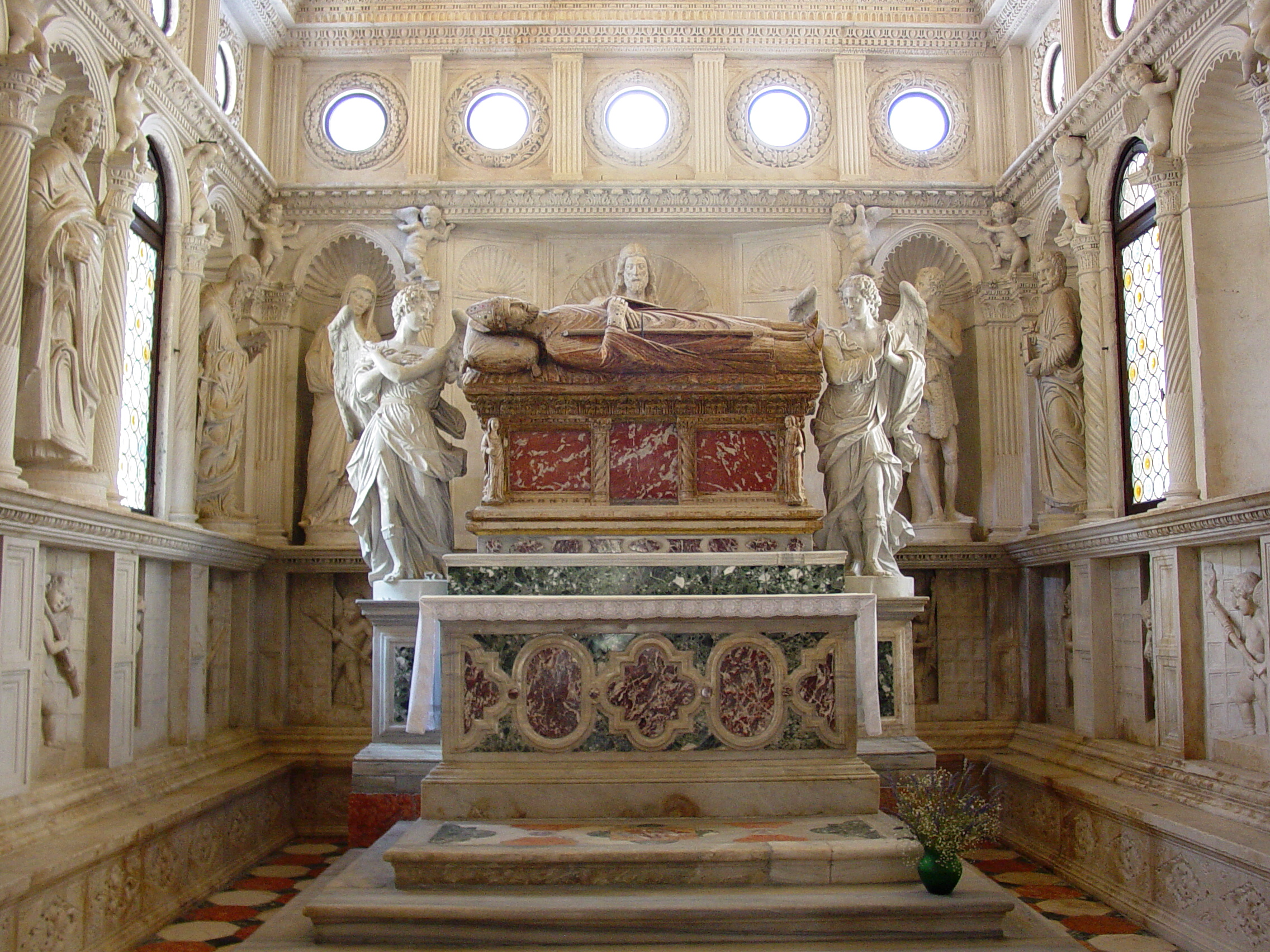
Interior of the chapel of St. John Ursini in Trogir Cathedral (mostly from 1483) is considered to be a masterpiece of Dalmatian early renaissance.

The Renaissance period of art and architecture in Croatia can be said to begin in 1441, when Juraj Dalmatinac was contracted to work on Šibenik Cathedral Only in the environment far from major governing centers was it possible for the artisan to build a church entirely to his own design. Apart from unusual mixing of Gothic and Renaissance style, it was highly original in the combination of stone building and montage construction (big stone blocks, pilasters and ribs were bounded with joints and slots on them – without concrete) in the way that was usual in wooden constructions. This was a unique building with so-called three-leaf frontal and half-barrel vaults, the first in Europe. The cathedral and its original stone dome was finished by Nikola Firentinac following the original plans of Juraj. On the cathedral there is a coronal of 72 sculpture portraits on the outside wall of the apses. Juraj himself did 40 of them, and all are unique with original characteristics on their faces.

Work on Šibenik cathedral inspired Nicola in his work on the expansion of the Chapel of Blessed John of Trogir in 1468. Just like Šibenik cathedral, it was composed out of large stone blocks with extreme precision. In cooperation with a disciple of Juraj, Andrija Aleši, Nicola achieved a unique harmony of architecture and sculpture according to antique ideals. From inside, there is no flat wall. In the middle of the chapel, on the altar, lies the sarcophagus of blessed John of Trogir. Surrounding this are reliefs of putti carrying torches that look like they were peeping out of doors of Underworld. Above them there are niches with sculptures of Christ and the apostles, amongst them are putti, circular windows encircled with fruit garland, and a relief of the Nativity. This is all covered with a coffered ceiling with an image of God in the middle and 96 portrait heads of angels. With so many faces of smiling children the chapel looks very cheerful and there isn't anything similar in European art of that time.

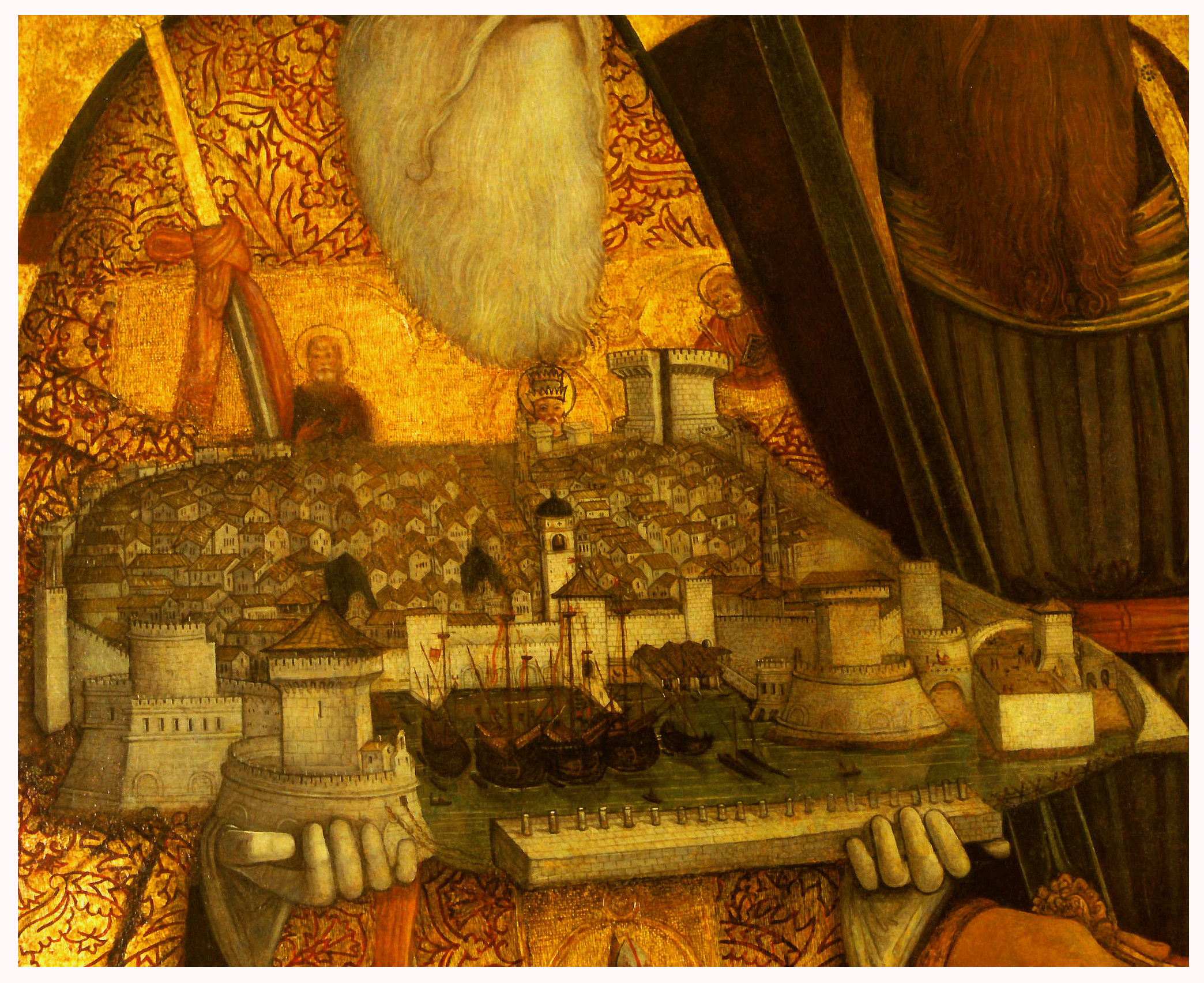
Model of Dubrovnik held by Saint Blaise in this detail from a triptych by Nikola Božidarević

Inside the protective walls of the Republic of Dubrovnik, and on several of the nearby islands, many Ragusan nobles built their country retreats, elegant villas set in renaissance gardens. These were not as ornate as their Italian counterparts, but made good use of the terrain with its seaside location and plentiful supply of stone. A good example is Sorkočević's villa on the island of Lapad near Dubrovnik. Built in 1521, with an unusual asymmetrical design, the house and garden are preserved in their original form.

Many Croatian renaissance sculptures are linked to its architecture, and the most beautiful one is perhaps the relief Flagellation of Christ by Juraj Dalmatinac on the altar of St Staš in Split cathedral. Three almost naked figures, are caught in vibrant movement.

The most important Croatian Renaissance painters were from Dubrovnik: Lovro Dobričević, Mihajlo Hamzić and Nikola Božidarević. They painted the altar screens with the first hints of portraits of characters, linear perspective and even still life motifs. In north-western Croatia, the beginning of the wars with the Ottoman Empire caused many problems, but in the long term it both reinforced the northern influence (by having the Austrians as the rulers).

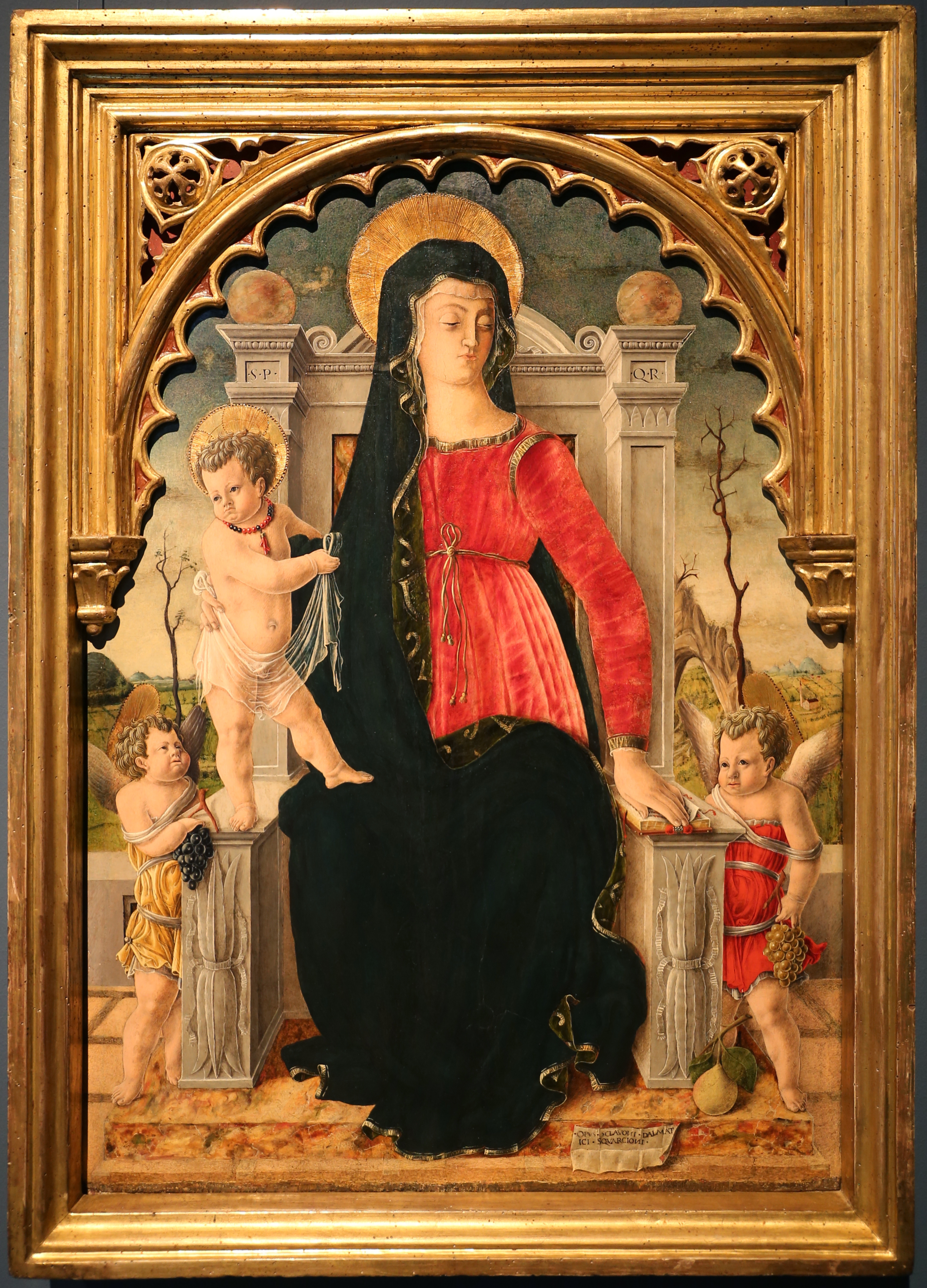
Juraj Ćulinović, Virgin and Child enthroned with Angels, 1456 - 1460, Gemäldegalerie

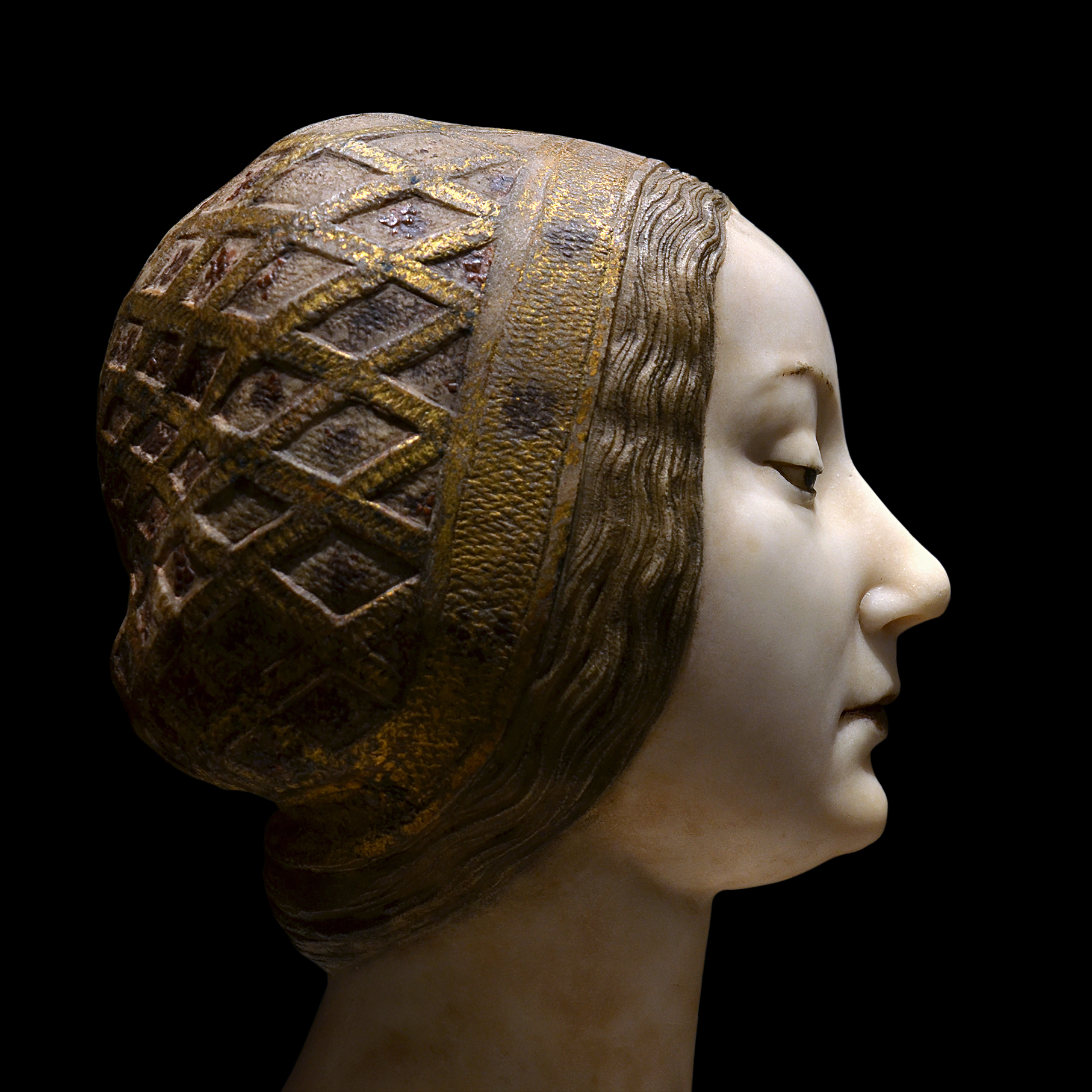
Franjo Vranjanin, Bust of Isabella of Aragon, 1490, Kunsthistorisches Museum

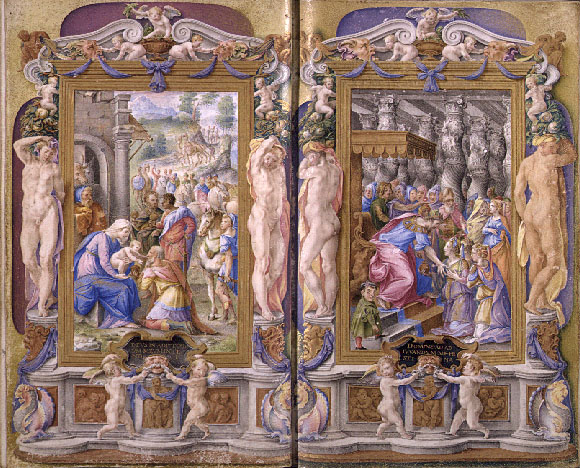
Juraj Klović, Farnese Hours, 1546, Morgan Library & Museum

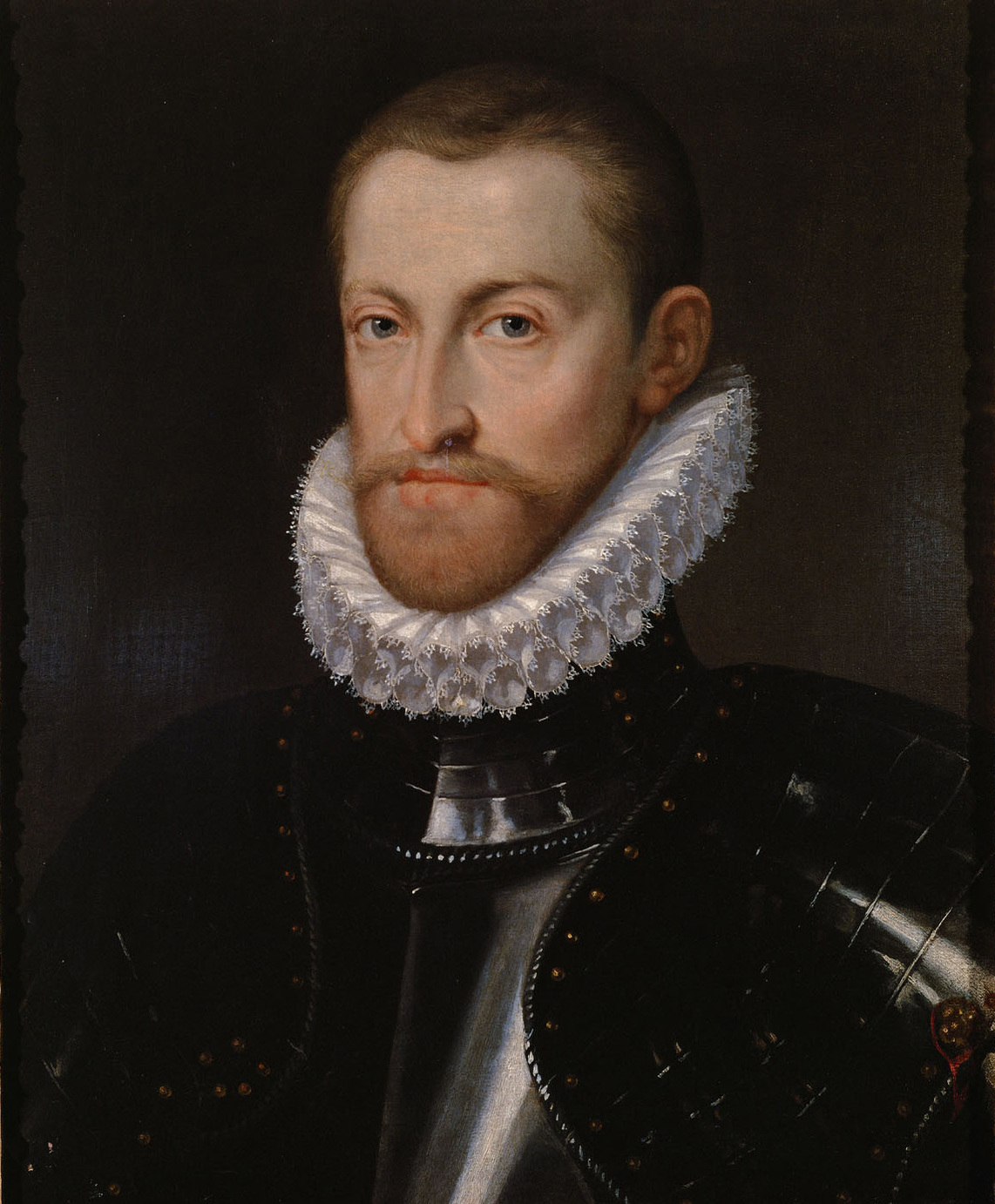
Martin Rota, Archduke Ernest of Austria, 1576 - 1580, Kunsthistorisches Museum

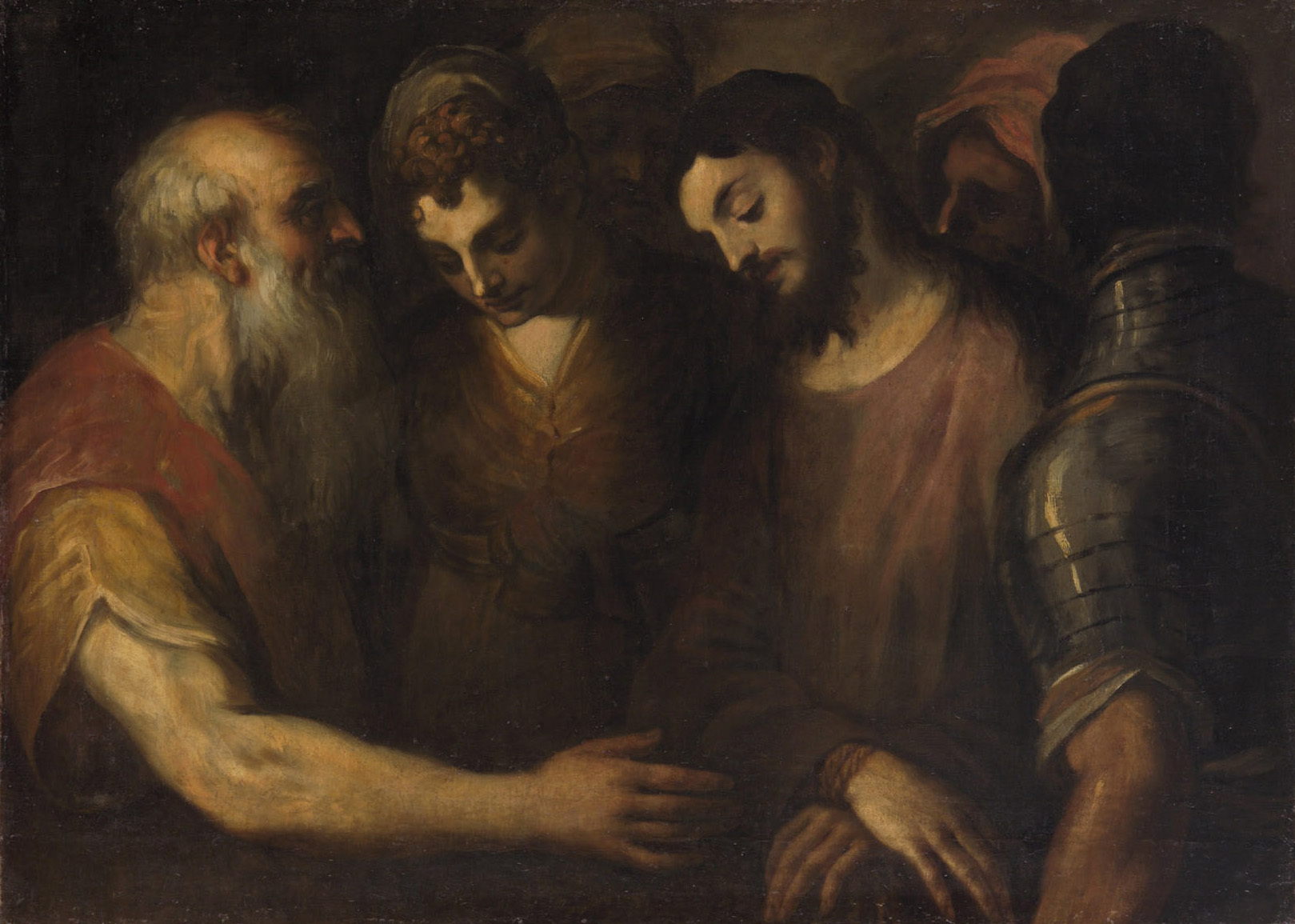
Andrija Medulić, Christ before Pilate, 1555, Kunsthistorisches Museum

=== Architecture ===
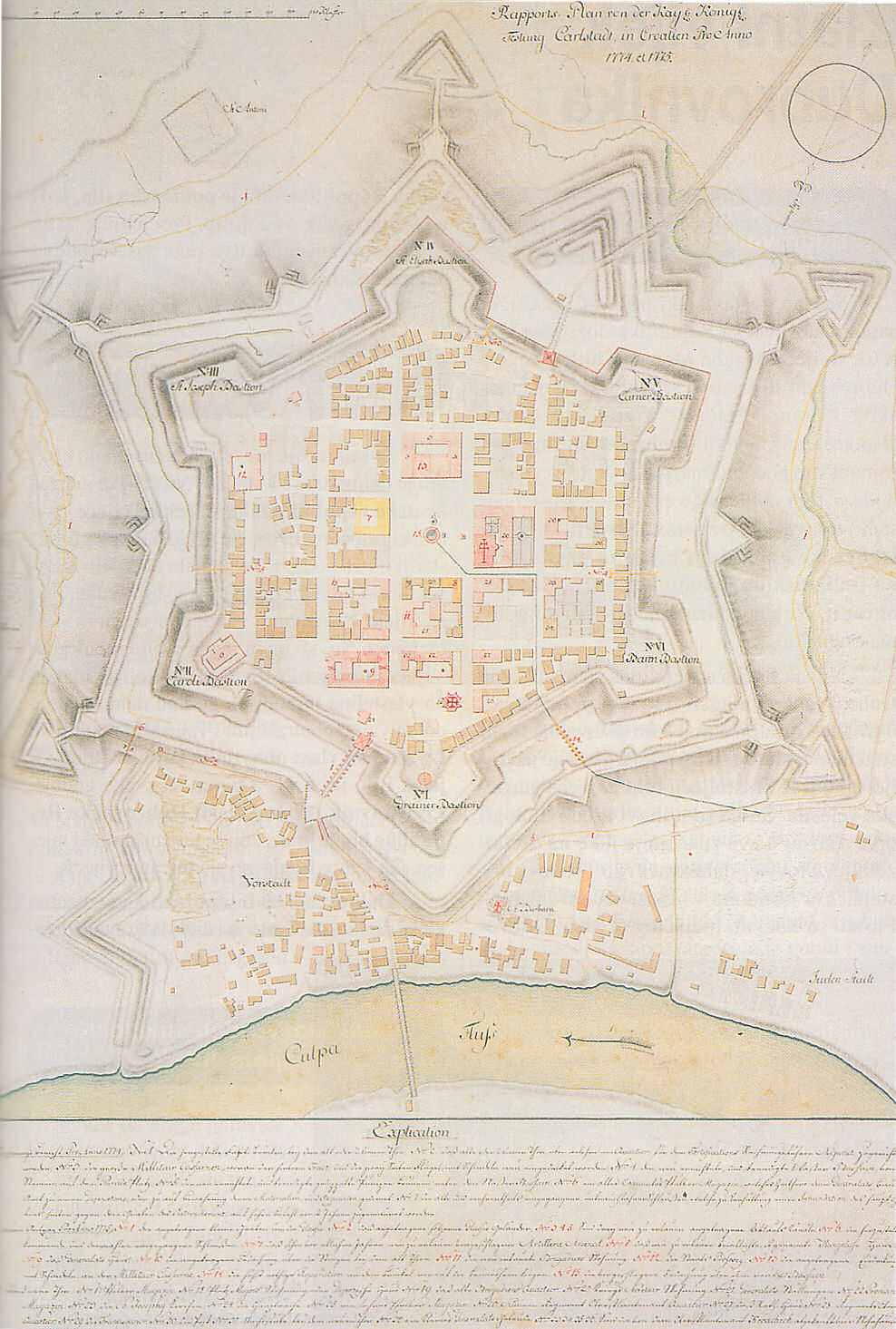
Renaissance star-shaped fortress of Karlovac (designed in 1579)

With permanent danger from the Ottomans in the east, the Renaissance had only a modest influence, while fortifications thrived. The plan for the fortified city of Karlovac in 1579 was first entirely new urban city to be built to a Renaissance plans (the so-called "ideal city" plan) in Europe. It was built in a radial plan, later common in the Baroque.

Renaissance fort of Ratkay family in Veliki Tabor from 16th century has mixed features of Gothic architecture (high roofs) and renaissance (cloister and round towers) making it an example of mannerism.

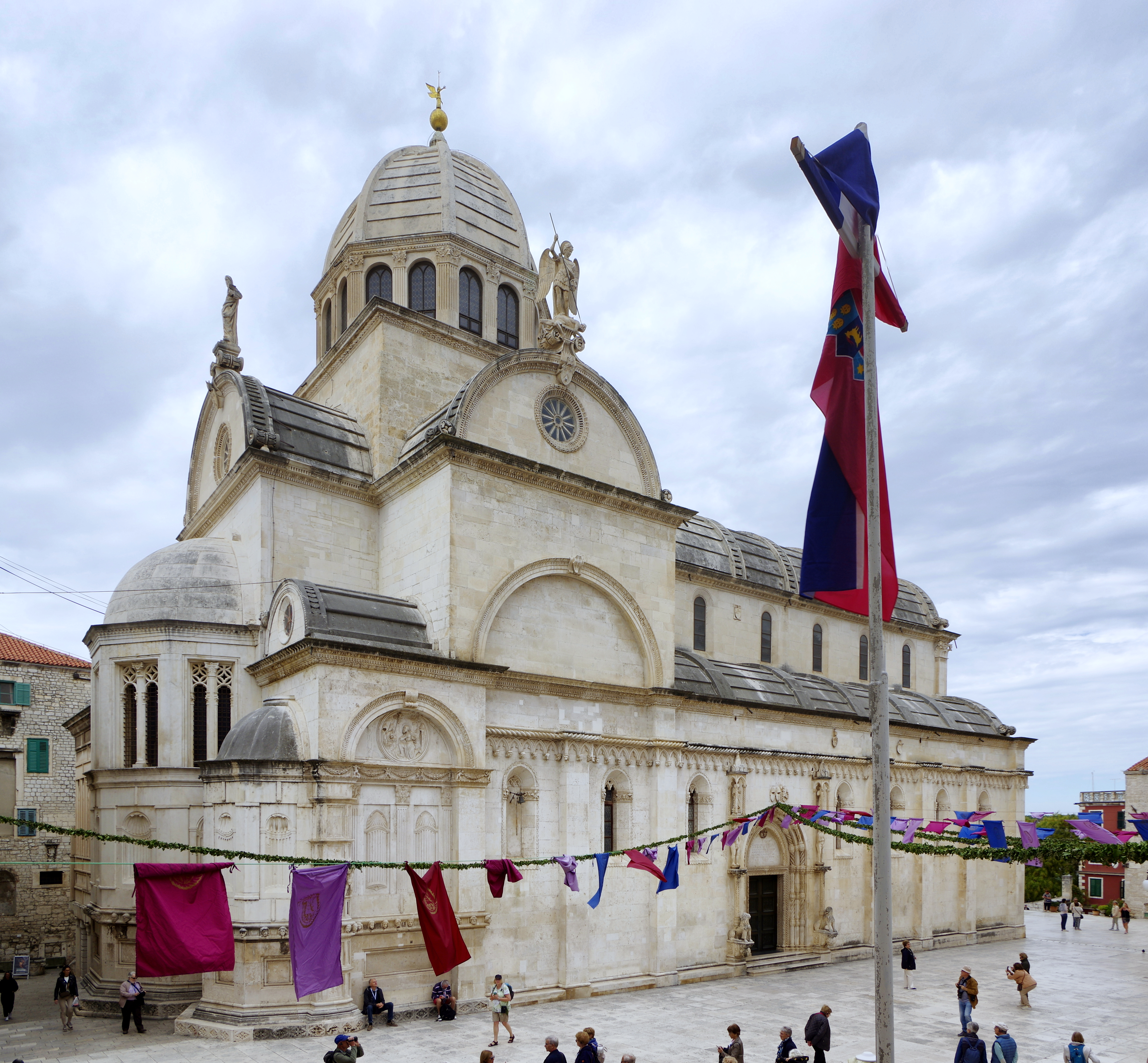
Šibenik Cathedral of St James

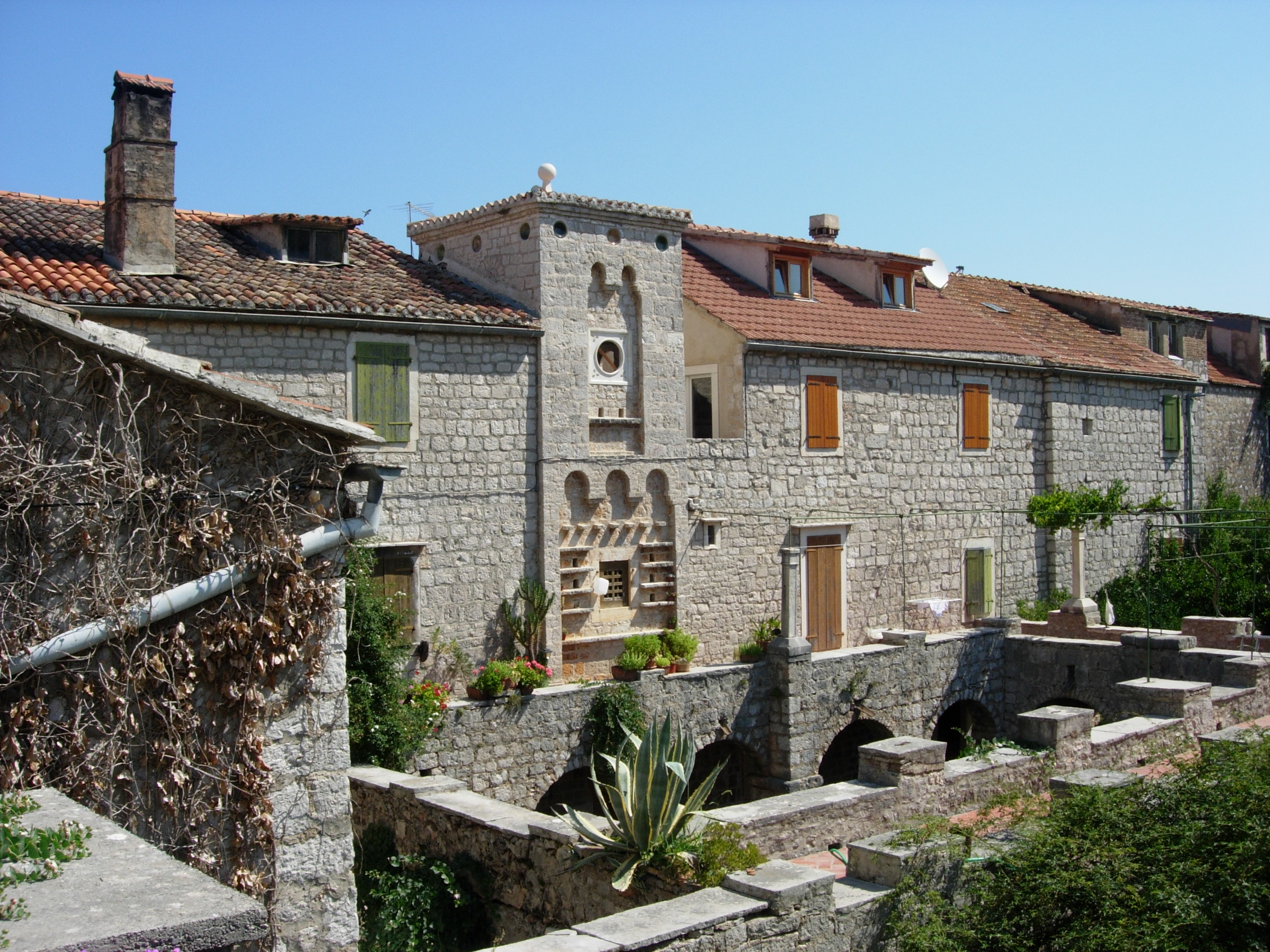
Tvrdalj Castle, Hvar

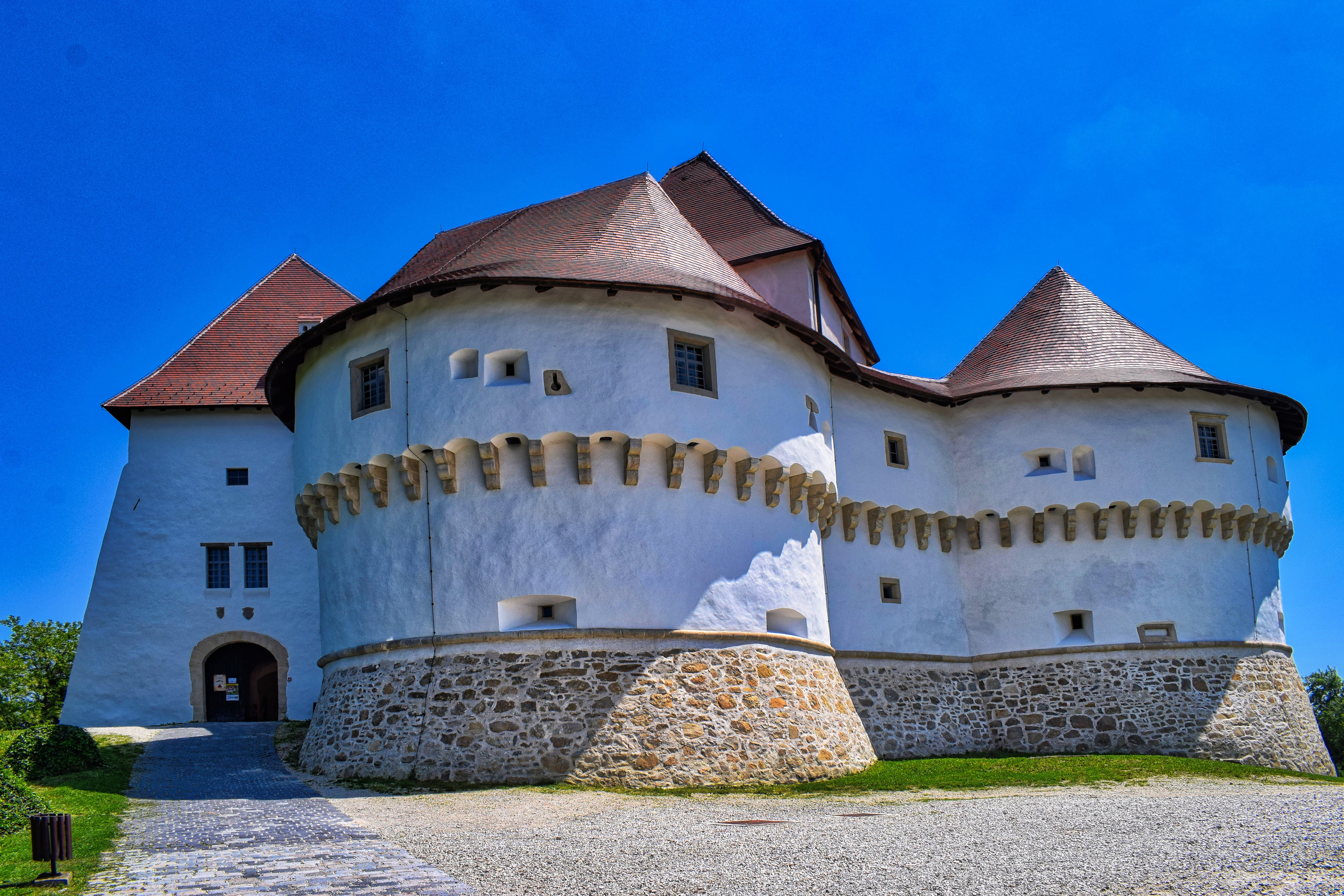
Veliki Tabor Castle

=== Literature ===
Croatian literature in the 16th century, soon after the beginnings of literary creation in the vernacular, especially in Dalmatia and Dubrovnik, fitted into the aspirations that prevailed in Renaissance Europe. At the beginning of Croatian Renaissance literature is the work of Marko Marulić. Croatian poets in that period were Petrarchists (Šiško Menčetić, Džore Držić, Hanibal Lucić, Dinko Ranjina, Dominko Zlatarić), and new species such as comedy came to life immediately (Nikola Nalješković, Marin Držić), pastoral prose in which poems modeled on Sannazar's "Arcadia" ("Mountains of Petar Zoranić"), fishing pastoral ("Fishing and fishing complaints" by Petar Hektorović) and dialogical treatise (Nikola Vitov Gučetić, Frane Petrić) are incorporated. It is specific to the Croatian Renaissance that, in addition to Latin and vernacular, the language of literature and culture in the 16th century became partly Italian.

Notable works:

- Judita, 1501
- Davidiad, 1517
- Fishing and Fishermen's Talk, 1566
- Planine ('Mountains'), 1536
- Robinja ('Slave girl'), 1530
- Vazetje Sigeta grada, 1584
- Novela od Stanca, 1550
- Dundo Maroje, 1551 or 1556

== Artists of the Croatian Renaissance ==
Marin Držić

- Jeronim Vidulić – poet
- Mikša Pelegrinović – poet
- Juraj Šižgorić – poet
- Ivan Česmički – poet
- Marko Marulić – poet
- Šiško Menčetić – poet
- Ludovik Crijević Tuberon – Latinist and historian
- Džore Držić – poet
- Hanibal Lucić – poet and playwright
- Ivan Lukačić – composer and musician
- Petar Hektorović – poet and writer
- Marin Držić – playwright and prose writer
- Nikola Nalješković – poet
- Petar Zoranić – novelist
- Brne Karnarutić – poet
- Mavro Vetranović – writer
- Pavao Skalić – encyclopedist
- Dinko Zlatarić – poet
- Juraj Baraković – poet
- John of Kastav – fresco painter

== See also ==
- Croatian art
- Culture of Croatia
- Renaissance
