= Marko Grčić =

Marko Grčić (born 17 September 1938) is a Croatian journalist, translator, poet, essayist, and publicist.

== Life ==
He was born on 17 September 1938 in Sinj, Croatia. After completing his secondary education in Sinj, Grčić pursued studies in Yugoslav and English languages and literature at the Faculty of Philosophy in Zagreb. His professional career began in 1959 as a part-time proofreader for Vjesnik u srijedu. In 1964, he transitioned to a full-time editor role, and from 1967 to 1976, he served as a desk editor. Subsequently, he worked as a desk editor at Start magazine until 1986, followed by a position as assistant editor-in-chief. From 1990 to 2004, he held the role of editor at the weekly Globus.

In 2008, a selection of his columns was published in a book titled Riječi, riječi, riječi (Words, words, words), which earned him the Kiklop Award. In 2013, he received the Zvana Črnja Award for his essay book Slijepi Argus (Blind Argus).

Grčić has contributed poems, essays, and translations to various literary magazines. In 1968, he participated in a modern Croatian translation of the Bible. His work includes contemporary language translations of notable Croatian literary classics such as Marulić's Judita, Zoranić's Planine, Hektorović's Ribanje i ribarsko prigovaranje, and Lucić's Robinja. He translated into Croatia works by renowned international authors, including Eliot, Gibran, Blake, Pound, Borges, and Tagore.

== Bibliography ==
=== Poetry ===
- Nebeska vučica (1969)
- Behemot (1977)
- Nebeska vučica: izabrane pjesme (2001)

=== Essay collections ===
- Provincia deserta (1970)
- Riječi, riječi, riječi (2008)
- Spomenar (2010)
- Tri hrvatske nostalgije (2014)
- Slijepi Argus (2013)
- Muzej na Medvjeđoj planini (2017)
- Je li Biblija opasna knjiga, i druge uspomene (2018)
- Otpalo lišće (2021)
