= Vinko Pribojević =

- Born: mid-15th century Hvar, Republic of Venice
- Died: after 1532
- Other name: Vincentius Priboevius
- Known for: founder of the pan-Slavic ideology
- Notable work: On the Origin and Glory of the Slavs (Latin: De origine successibusque Slavorum)

Vinko Pribojević (Latin: Vincentius Priboevius mid-15th century – after 1532) was a Croatian writer and Dominican monk from the Republic of Venice, best known as one of the founders of the early pan-Slavic ideology.

== Life ==
Pribojević was born on the island of Hvar, in Venetian Dalmatia (now Croatia). He was educated in the humanist spirit and joined the Dominican Order around 1522.

His most famous work is the speech De origine successibusque Slavorum (On the Origin and Glory of the Slavs), where he identifies the Illyrians with Slavs as the indigenous peoples of the Balkans. In particular, per the humanist approach of the Renaissance that combined scripture with ancient myth, Pribojević claimed that the paleo-Balkanic populations such as the Illyrians, Thracians and Macedonians were of a Slavic character. Furthermore according to Pribojević, Alexander the Great, multiple Caesars and Saint Jerome were Slavs. His main goal was to celebrate the Slavic world, speak about the origins and "glorious history" of Slavs, using the word "Slav" as a designation for people from various territories. American historian John Van Antwerp Fine, Jr. notes Pribojević and Juraj Šižgorić among the early modern scholars from Dalmatia who did not consider themselves to be Croats, but rather identified with Slavs and Illyrians.

His speech, made in Venice in 1525, was printed into a small book in 1532. It was also published in Latin and Italian several times. Its passionate glorification of Slavs and its strong pathos played a major role in the birth of the pan-Slavic ideology. It was the first time that such ideology was formulated as a program, which was further developed by writers like Mavro Orbini and Juraj Križanić.

== Legacy ==
Pribojević was the first to incorporate Illyrians and their myth into the Croatian and Slavic historiography (or rather ideology), as a shield and rampart against the German, Hungarian and Italian national and territorial ambitions. His identification of Slavs as Illyrians, as well as his enthusiastic glorification of the historical greatness and importance of Illyrians, left a deep mark on world history and outlook.

He was one of the most important Croatian and global Latinists who created the ideological molds of the future. He is also the ancestor of the Croatian Illyrian movement of the 19th century, and an initiator of the pan-Slavic ideology.

== Works ==
- De origine successibusque Slavorum (The Origin and Glory of Slavs), 1532. Also available in Croatian as Podrijetlo i slava Slavena, 1997

== See also ==
- Mikša Pelegrinović
- Hanibal Lucić
- Petar Hektorović
