= Mikša Pelegrinović =

Croatian poet

- Born: c. 1500; Hvar, Republic of Venice
- Died: 26 December 1562 (aged 61–62); Zadar, Republic of Venice
- Other name: Michiele Pelegrinovich
- Occupation: poet

Mikša Pelegrinović (or Michiele Pelegrinovich) (c. 1500 – 26 December 1562) was a Croatian poet.

== Biography ==
Pelegrinović was born around the year 1500 in the town of Hvar on the island of the same name. He came from a noble family originating in the Apulian town of Barletta and was a son of Marijan and Nikolica. He attended a humanist school in his town of birth and he studied law in Padua.

In 1530, as a lesser nobleman he accepted the responsibilities of a Hvar defensor. In the same year, he became a Korčulan Notary and, at the end of 1538, he made his return to Hvar. On 5 February 1548, Pelegrinović was elected as a chancellor in the Zadar council. He travelled twice to Venice, in 1556 and 1557, probably to publish Jeđupka or his other works. It was at that time that he met Livija Martinušević, whom he married in 1558 and with whom he had a daughter, Julija, and a son, Julije.

He lived in Zadar until his death. Two days prior to his death, he dictated his Last Will before a notary.

== Literary works ==
Pelegrinović's literary work is not very well known. It is certain that in 1527 he composed a miscellany of carnival songs, Jeđupka, and in 1556 he wrote an epistle addressed to the Ragusan poet Sabo Bobaljević, written in octosyllabic quatrains with a comical theme on curing old-age (Od jazavac vitno rebro, / i od hrta lijeve desni, / od komarca hrbat desni, / i sve stuci u prah dobro). However, from the preserved writings of his contemporaries (Nikola Nalješković, Mavro Vetranović, Petar Hektorović etc.) we know that Pelegrinović had written much more literary material.

In 1525, the historian Vinko Pribojević mentioned Pelegrinović in his speech on the origin of Croats, when speaking of famous poets. Petar Hektorović dedicated to Pelegrinović in 1528 his translation of Ovid's Remedia Amoris (Od lika ljubenoga).

== Works (editions) ==
- Pjesme Nikole Nalješkovića, Andrije Čubranovića, Miše Pelegrinovića i Saba Mišetića Bobaljevića i Jegjupka neznana pjesnika (biographies written by Luka Zore and Franjo Rački; text for printing edited by Sebastijan Žepić), JAZU, Stari pisci hrvatski, book VIII., Zagreb, 1876
- Mikša Pelegrinović: "Jejupka", Mogućnosti, XX., 1973, pp. 781–808
- Počinje Jejupka gospodina Miše Pelegrinovića vlastelina hvarskoga, Mogućnosti, XXI., 1974, pp. 684–710
