= Zvane Črnja Award =

Croatian literary award

The Zvane Črnja Award is a Croatian literary award given for the best Croatian book of essays. It is awarded once a year in memory of the Croatian writer, culturologist and publicist Zvane Črnja. The award consists of a plaque and a monetary amount and was established in 2007 as part of the Pulski dani eseja (Pula Days of Essays event). The competition is announced and the award bestowed by the Croatian Writers' Association in conjunction with the Istrian branch of the DHK.

== Winners ==
- 2007: Tomislav Žigmanov, for Minimum in maximis - zapisi s ruba o nerubnome.
- 2008: Mirko Tomasović, for Nove slike iz povijesti hrvatske književnosti.
- 2009: Roman Karlović, for Melankolija imperija.
- 2010: Dean Duda, for Hrvatski književni bajkomat.
- 2011: Marko Pogačar, for Atlas glasova: Antieseji.
- 2012: Dunja Detoni Dujmić, for Lijepi prostori.
- 2013: Marko Grčić, for Slijepi Argus.
- 2014: Pavao Pavličić, for Narodno veselje.
- 2015: Marina Šur Puhlovski, for Književnost me iznevjerila: (Eseji s margine).
- 2016: Ivica Matičević, for Mjera za priču: Književnokritički ogledi o suvremenoj hrvatskoj prozi.
- 2017: Jelena Lužina, for Marija Crnobori: eseji o fragmentima.
- 2018: Damir Barbarić, for Putokazi.
- 2019: Zlatko Kramarić, for Sat hrvatskog, re:vizija prošlih sjećanja.
- 2020: Leo Rafolt, for Virus in fabula.
- 2021: Božica Jelušić, for Kajogledi, vnebogledi.
