= Nikola Nalješković =

Dalmatian poet and mathematician

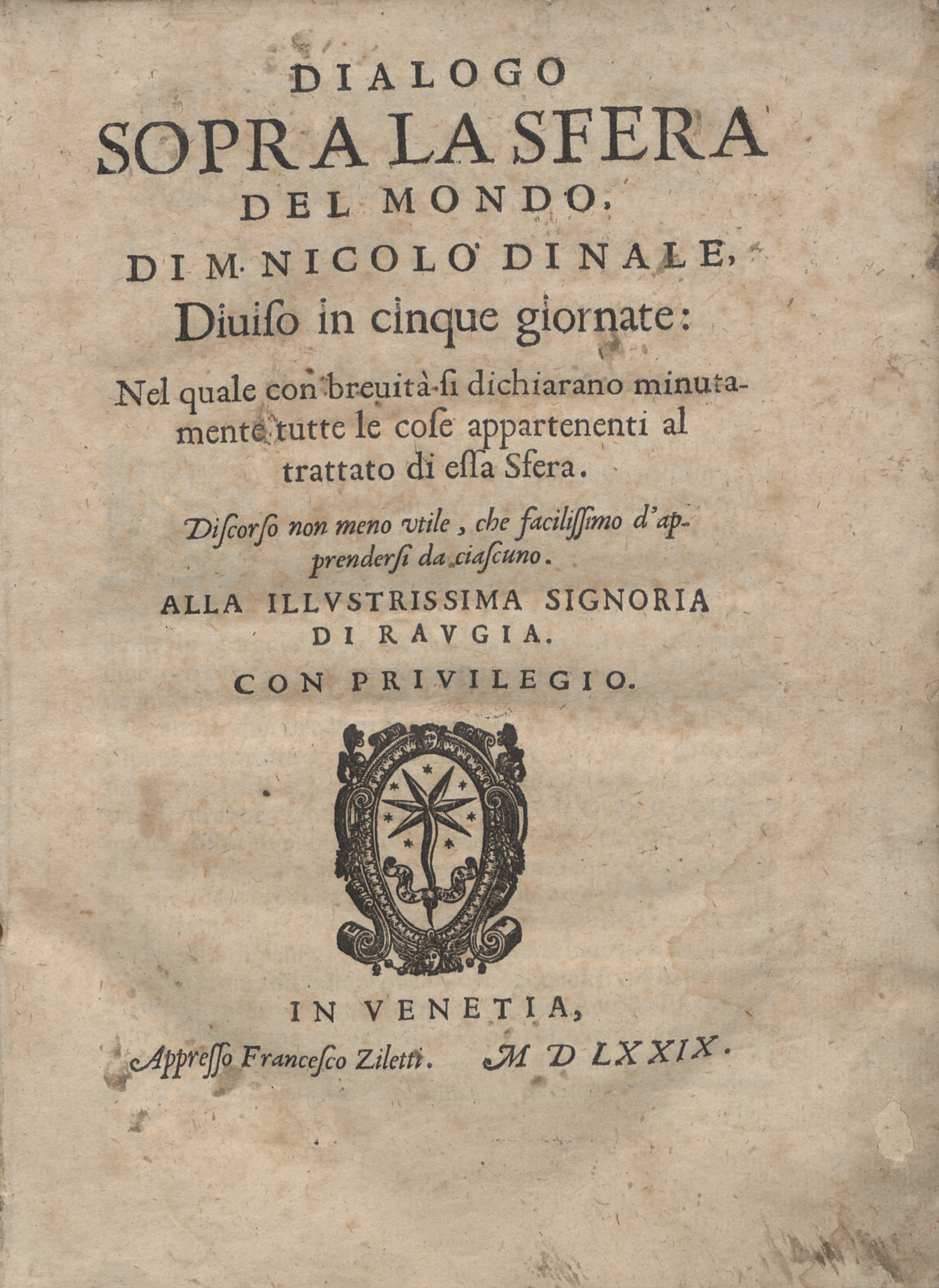
Dialogo sopra la sfera del mondo, 1579

Nikola Nalješković (Italian: Niccolò Nale) (around 1500, Dubrovnik - 1587, Dubrovnik) was a Ragusan poet, playwright and scholar. He wrote poetry, romantic canzones, masques (carnival songs), epistles, pastoral plays, mythological plays, farce, comedy and drama with features of Plautine erudite comedy and Roman mime. His dramatic works include lascivious and common themes.

== Biography ==
Born a commoner from a family of merchants and scientists, he attended a graduate school in Dubrovnik, and had a financially unsuccessful commercial career which left him bankrupt. Nalješković worked as a scribe, chancellor, and surveyor.

In his later years, he engaged in astronomy and mathematics. He was asked by Rome to give his opinion on the reform of the calendar while Pope Gregory XIII was preparing the debate (Dialogo sopra la sphere del mondo). Due to his age, Nalješković was unable to travel to Rome, but he sent his written support for the leap year.

== Literary work ==
In the mid 16th century, Nalješković was the central personality in Croatia's first interlinked literary circle (with Mavro Vetranović, Ivan VIDALIćI, Peter Hektorović and Hydrangeas Bartučević). He is significant for the genre diversity of his opus, which interlaced the paradigms of Mediaeval, Renaissance and Mannerist poetry, contrasting the themes of privacy and publicity, physicality and spirituality, laughter and isolation, realism and sensualism, rationalism and sentimentality, death and joy.

Nalješković's works were printed in 1873 and 1876 in Stari pisci hrvatski (Old Croatian Writers). In the 1960s, the oldest known manuscript (from the 17th century) was discovered. To this day, this manuscript has not been released. It is kept in the National and University Library of Zagreb.

In the history of Croatian literature, Nalješković is also notable because the language in which he penned his works was expressly called Croatian, and the Croatian name is emphasised relatively often ("Tim narod Hrvata vapije i viče" - "this nation of Croats cries and clamours").

== Poetry ==
In his 180 romantic canzones (published in 1876, under the title Pjesni ljuvene), a kind of history of the poet's love was set, from time to time in a morally didactic tone, and a view of Dubrovnik's social life at the time was given, intertwining reflection and melancholia, pain in love and "general pessimism."

Nalješković probably wrote pjesni bogoljubne, i.e. religious, spiritual poetry, in his old age. Continuing the mediaeval tradition, the themes of Christian theology enriched the complex forms and meditative-reflective emphases in his poetry, as well as the extremely emotional attitudes of the lyrics' subject. The religious reflexivity of the individual verse subjects are characteristics of Renaissance poetics, while the motifs (Marian themes, and themes of passion), composition and language were influenced by mediaeval poetics. Nalješković's religious lyrics were associated with his piety, due to his membership of the Saint Anthony fraternity.

== Epistles ==
Nalješković was the most prolific writer of epistles of the Croatian Renaissance. He wrote 37 epistles, which addressed friends and family (especially poets: Petar Hektorović, Nikola Dimitrović, Mavor Vetranović, Dinko Ranjina etc.) from Zadar to Dubrovnik. He also wrote to princes, as well as ecclesiastical and secular potentates. Besides exploring Croatian cultural history, Nalješković's epistles (written with doubly rhymed dodeca-syllables or in octo-syllable quatrains) were often tinged with a feeling of pain, thirst for peace and freedom, and Croatian national pride, all in a laudatory tone, with elements of humour and satire.

== Tombstones ==
Nalješković's tombstones were, in terms of genre and expression, close to epistles, apart from the odd single instance in which there was a motive for them to deal with universal content (the phenomenon of death).

== Masques ==
Twelve of Nalješković's carnival songs (Pjesni od maskerate; the 9th, 4th and 7th masques were published in 1844 and 1858, and all of them in 1873) constituted complete masques. The first was a sort of prologue announcing the arrival of the company (composed of masked speakers of other songs: lovers, Latins, gypsies, shepherds, slaves). From the usual framework of carnival masque tradition, Nalješković's masques stood out for their risky carnival obscenity and erotic verbosity, reflecting the merry and lascivious Renaissance carnival atmosphere.

== Comedies ==
Seven of the unaddressed stage work manuscripts, composed of a prologue and one act in verses, have been classed as comedies (they were printed for the first time in an issue of Stari pisci hrvatski). The first four comedies enter into the scope of the "pastoral" genre.

Komedija prva (the first comedy) dramatises typically pastoral themes, with some magical elements, reminiscent of Tasso's Aminta but also of Džore Držić's eclogue Radmio and Ljubimir, and the prophetic Tirena by Marin Držić. The allegoric, celebratory setting was dynamised by the alternation of realism and fantasy, lasciviousness and sentimentality, naturalism and humour.

Komedija druga (the second comedy), a mythological play, dramatises a motif of classical mythology which is known as the court of Paris. At its core is the theme of the wise judge. Three fairies quarrel over which of them an apple bearing the words "for the most beautiful" was left for. A pastor takes them to a judge, and after the judgement the fairies run amok in the forest with the pastors. - a judge of peace and justice in the grove/Dubrovnik, who established a momentarily disturbed peace. (??)

Komedija treća (the third comedy) is, with regards to genre, a Croatian dramska robinja ('dramatic threnody'). The position of the fairy who laments, however, turns this pastoral dramatic threnody into a real scene play: agony and competition akin to a moreška between a satyr hunter (nature) and a seeker of youths (culture), a kind of deux ex machina while freeing the slave-girl.

The unfinished Komedija četvrta (fourth comedy), a fragment of earlier texts on the topic of moreška, dramatises the theme of peace and freedom in the grove.

Komedija peta and Komedija šesta (the fifth and sixth comedies) are, with regards to genre, the first examples of farce in Croatian literature; both realistically show life in a Dubrovnik home, cultivating the theme of unfaithful men. They adjoin the tradition of Middle Age farce and ancient mime.

In Komedija šesta (published in 1873), a farce similar to the fifth and reminiscent of French mediaeval farce, the plot entangles itself: a housemaid was smitten with the lord, but so was the midwife; having found this out, the woman pretends to be dead, and the priest calms the situation. The social criticism of this comedy was stronger; the language was more crude, and the situation harsher and more naturalistic.

Komedija sedma (the seventh comedy), a snippet of Dubrovnik life as well as a farce and divided into three acts, has some characteristics of Plautine erudite comedy and Roman mime (romantic intrigue). Based on real dialogues and concrete details, characters and images of Dubrovnik life, it is a kind of forerunner to Marin Držić's Dundo Maroje, but also Novela od Stanca.

== Works ==
- Pjesni ljuvene - Love poems
- Pjesni od maskerate - Carnival songs
- Sedam nenaslovljenih komedija - Seven untitled comedies
- Pjesni bogoljubne - Poems of piety/religious devotion
- Dialogo sopra la sfera del mondo (in Italian). Venezia: Francesco Ziletti. 1579.

== Bibliography ==
- Dadić, Žarko (April 1988). "Mavro Vetranović i Nikola Nalješković kao prirodoslovci" [Mavro Vetranović and Nikola Nalješković as natural scientists] (PDF). Dani Hvarskoga kazališta (in Croatian). 14 (1): 171–179.
- Ježić, Mislav (1992). "Nešto kulturoloških razmišljanja o regionalizmu u Hrvatskoj i Europi" [Some culturological observations concerning regionalism in Croatia and Europe] (PDF). Društvena istraživanja (in Croatian). 1 (1): 13–24.
- Milčetić, Ivan (1907). "Poslanice Nikole Nale vlastelima Hvarskijem, i ńih odgovori godišta 1540., 41., 57., 64" [Letters of Nikola Nale to the Landlords of Hvar, and Their Responses in the Years 1540., 41., 57., 64.]. Građa za povijest književnosti hrvatske (in Serbo-Croatian). 5: 303–309.
