= Marina Šur Puhlovski =

Croatian writer

Marina Šur Puhlovski is a Croatian writer. She was born and raised in Zagreb, and studied comparative literature and philosophy at university. She writes in a wide range of genres, including short stories, novels, travelogues and essays. Her debut novel Trojan Horse appeared in 1991. Her recent novel Wild Woman received critical acclaim and was translated into English by Christina Pribichevich Zorić.

In 2015 she won the Zvane Črnja Award for her book Književnost me iznevjerila: (Eseji s margine)..
