= Judita =

1501 epic poem by Marko Marulić

Judith
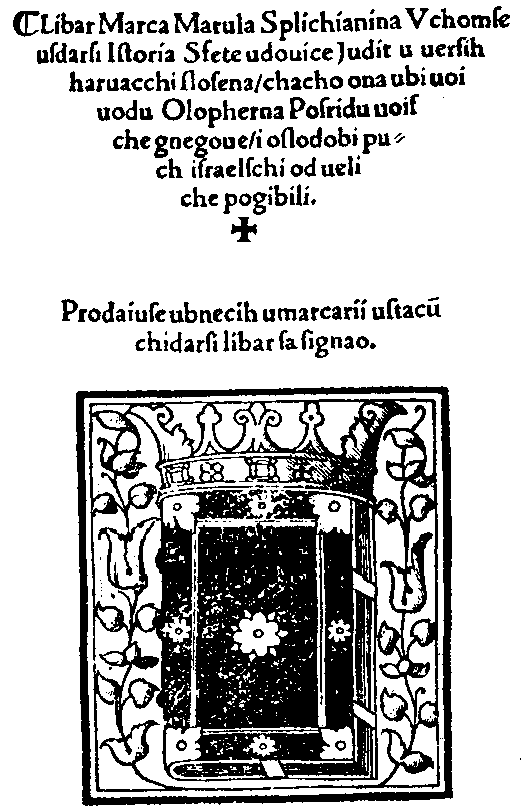
- Cover of the first edition of Judith
- Author: Marko Marulić
- Original title: Judita
- Language: Chakavian Croatian
- Subject: Book of Judith
- Set in: Bethulia
- Publisher: Guglielmo da Fontaneto
- Publication date: 13 August 1521
- Publication place: Republic of Venice

Judith (Croatian: Judita) is one of the most important Croatian literary works, an epic poem written by the "father of Croatian literature" Marko Marulić in 1501.

== Editions ==
The work was finished on April 22, 1501, and was published three times during Marulić's lifetime. The first edition was arranged by Petar Srićić of Split and was printed in Venice by Guglielmo da Fontaneto on August 13, 1521, that is, 20 years after it was written. One extant copy of the first edition is held in the Mala braća Franciscan library in Dubrovnik, and the other in the Zadar family Paravia's library, which is today a part of the Scientific Library of Zadar.

The second edition was edited by Zadar librarian Jerolim Mirković, published on May 30, 1522, and is illustrated with nine woodcuts depicting war scenes. The ninth woodcut is signed with the letter M, and it was therefore assumed that Marulić himself was the author of the woodcuts. One copy of Mirković's edition was given to the University Library by Ivan Kukuljević, and the other copy, still held in the Collection of Manuscripts and Old Books of the University Library, originates from the Kukuljević's legacy.

The third edition was printed on January 29, 1522, for the Dubrovnik librarian Jacomo di Negri. (Transposing the date from Venetian calendar, the publication date would be January 29, 1523.) The only surviving copy of that edition is held at the Bavarian State Library in Munich.

== Theme and influence ==
The frequency of printing indicates that the text found its readership not only in Split, which had at most 200 literate citizens at the time, but in other Dalmatian centres. The poem contains 2126 dodecasyllabic lines, with caesurae after the sixth syllable, composed in six books (libar). The linguistic basis of the book is Split Chakavian speech and the Shtokavian lexis, and the Glagolitic original of the legend; the work thus foreshadows the unity of Croatian, as Marulić puts it himself on the cover "u uersih haruacchi slosena" / "in Croatian verses laid out".

Marulić's Judith has none of the decorative epithets typical of folk epics. The epic poem is also notable for the Humanistic treatment of the subject and the author's Petrarchan descriptions of Judith's beauty. Judith is interesting as a cultural monument as well as for its composition. The author's choice of a subject that simultaneously deals with an act of heroism and a crime shows suggests he privileged the literary structure (plot, drama) of the material, and only then considered its moralistic overtones.

Thematically, Judith deals with the story of the widow Judith who by her heroic act—the treason, seduction and the murder of Assyrian general Holofernes—saves the city of Bethulia. It was no accident that Marulić chose the story of the Biblical Judith for literary treatment. His work stemmed in part from his desire to offer a literature to "even those who understand no scholarly books", and the plot would seem to have contemporary parallels—a homeland invaded by foreigners, as the Balkans were being swept by the "eastern dragon"—the Ottoman Turks. Insofar as the poem has political or moral weight, Judith is intended as an exemplar of confidence in God and in eternal justice.

== The plot ==
=== The first book ===
The first book describes the Babylonian ruler Nebuchadnezzar II (who conquered Syria and Palestine), his slaying of Arpachshad, and his desire to rule the world. Nebuchadnezzar sends his general Holofernes to conquer as much land as he can, terrorizing the inhabitants.

=== The second book ===
Holofernes' military campaign, ranging across many lands, finally brings him to Israel. The people, in horror, pray to God for salvation.

=== The third book ===
Holofernes lays siege to Bethulia, cutting off the town's water supply. After much hardship, the leaders of the town decide to surrender, but Duke Ozias begs the Jews to be patient for five more days, to await God's salvation.

=== The fourth book ===
Judith, widow of Menasses, prays to the Lord and, along with Abra, her slave, flees the city that same night. God bestows upon her the gift of extraordinary beauty, which she will use to seduce Holofernes.

=== The fifth book ===
Holofernes invites Judith to dinner in his tent. On the fourth day of a festival, a drunken Holofernes falls asleep. Judith cuts off his head and mounts it on the city gates in view of his men. They flee in horror, and those who remain are easily driven off by the citizens.

=== The sixth book ===
The sixth book describes events in the Jerusalem after the departure of Holofernes' army. The High Priest Eliakim arrives with his priests to see Judith. She leaves for Jerusalem and returns after three months. She never remarries, and there is peace in the land as long as she lives. After her death she is mourned by the citizens for seven days.

== Translations ==
Judith was translated into standard Croatian in the 20th century: in 1969, Ivan Slamnig published a prose translation of the first chapter, and in 1983, Marko Grčić published an entire translation with an inline comparison to the original text. Nikica Kolumbić published a lyrical translation of the first chapter in 1971, and completed the full translation in 1985.
