= Planine =

1536 novel by Petar Zoranić

Planine Mountains
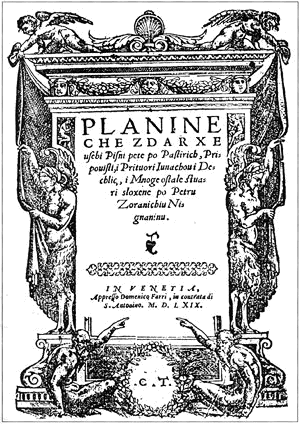
- Cover page of the first edition of the novel Planine from 1569.
- Author: Petar Zoranić
- Language: Croatian
- Genre: Pastoral, allegory, adventure
- Publication date: 1569 (print)
- Publication place: Republic of Venice
- Media type: Print

Planine (Croatian for 'The Mountains') is a work of prose fiction, generally considered to be the first Croatian novel. It was written by Petar Zoranić in 1536 and published posthumously in Venice in 1569.

The story tells about a poet's imaginary seven-day journey across Croatian mountains on which he embarks to forget his love miseries. Although pastoral in form, the principal line of the story is patriotic. It is composed of 24 chapters, and the introduction contains a dedication to Matej Matijević, the canon of Nin.

== Plot summary ==
The hero is the shepherd Zoran (i.e. Zoranić himself), who for seven years has been suffering from unrequited love towards a maiden Jaga. One morning, wandering around, he arrives at a well called Vodica, having gotten bored with his life. Suddenly, from a well a fairy Zorica (Napaea) appears, advising him to go to the mountains to find a particular plant which will cure his love pain. Then, on a golden apple, he makes a note of a beautiful fairy named Grace (Milošća), who transports him across the seas to Podgorje, where he continues his journey alone. But, soon he runs into a beast, from which Grace saves him and leads him by safer pathways. Afterwards, he arrives to the Gates of Hell (Paklenica), where the fairy tells him a tale of a young maiden Bura.

The next day Zoran meets a company of shepherds with whom he spends the next three days. On the fifth day, Zoran hears a story from shepherds about the origin of Velebit and heads further st. There he discovers a small group of shepherds that complains of being attacked by the wolves from Eastern sides (i.e. Turks), which has caused many of the shepherds to flee those areas. The next day Zoran is contacted by a fairy Consciousness (Svist) who directs him to the fairy Dinara. Dinara frees him by her magic powers from his love sufferings. Then Zoran dreams a vision of four fairies in the gardens of Glory (perivoj od Slave). These are the fairies Latinness (Latinka), Helleness (Grkinja) and Croatess (Hrvatica). While the first three hold in their arms a handful of golden apples (the symbol of a literary piece), the fairy Croatess is poor and makes a complaint about the small number of literary pieces written in folk language. The sixth day Zoran heads for home, but on his way he meets Dinara's daughter, fairy Krka, which drives him across Knin, Skradin and Šibenik down to the mouth of Krka (where she makes her disappearance). Thence, fairy Grace returns him to Zaton, the place of his departure. There he finds a grave of Juraj Divnić, the bishop of Nin, and swears to follow the path of the Lord's love.

== Meaning and edification ==
Zoranić lived in times of great danger from invading Ottoman Turks, and that consciousness has inspired his work; it pervaded it with patriotic fervour, against which all poets' sufferings, wishes, and troubles pale and retreat.

It is a pastoral-allegorical novel (a very common type of prose in that period), written mostly in prose but with many passages in verse. Typologically, it's a piece of its kind in Croatian literature, with motifs borrowed from Latinate and Italian literatures, with clearly discernible influences of Virgil, Ovid, Dante Alighieri, Giovanni Boccaccio, Petrarch, Jacopo Sannazaro, as well as domicile writers such as Marko Marulić and Croatian začinjavci.

Planine is in fact an allegory: it is a dream, transferred to the alleged Zoran's path from Nin across the sea to Starigrad under the Velebit, and thence uphills, over Paklenica, across the Velebit, and from Lika to Dinara, where he would by the river of Krka settle down to Šibenik and thence by the sea back to Nin. Accompanied by stanzas of Petrarchan and pastoral voice, Zoranić's novel, imbuing with life an Arcadian idyll, echoes with "sorrowful shepard's tune of dispersed legacy" (tužbenim pojem pastirov od rasute bašćine), but it also answers the call of fairy Croatess in the gardens of glory (chapter 20): she objurgates Croats who "many sapient and lettered are, who thyself and their tongue joyously appraise and deck apt are" (mnozi mudri i naučeni jesu, ki sebe i jazik svoj zadovoljno pohvaliti i naresiti umili bi) but are ashamed of their Croatian language (jezika hrvackoga) and rather prefer to write in a foreign one. So Zoranić, three centuries before the advent of the Illyrian movement, made a defense of Croatian, which is one of the most important attributes of this piece. Although the work was praised by modern literary analysts for its aesthetics, some criticized it for being too derivative in some aspects.

== See also ==
- Renaissance in Croatia
- Pastoral
