= Fishing and Fishermen's Talk =

1556 poem by Petar Hektorović

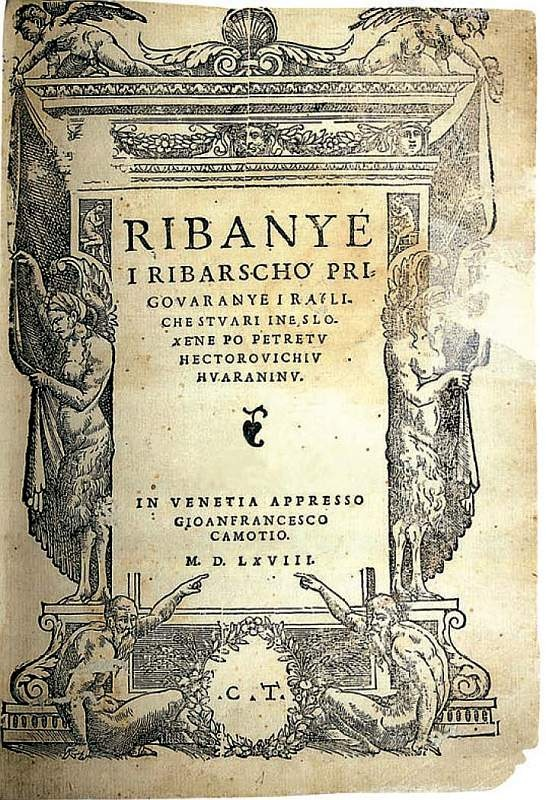
- Author: Petar Hektorović
- Original title: Ribanje i ribarsko prigovaranje
- Language: Croatian
- Genre: Poetry
- Publication date: 1568
- Publication place: Republic of Venice

Fishing and Fishermen's Talk (Croatian: Ribanje i ribarsko prigovaranje), also translated as Fishing and Fishermen's Conversations, is the most important literary work of Croatian Renaissance poet Petar Hektorović, finished on January 14, 1556, and printed in 1568 in Venice. Ribanje is a pastoral and philosophic narrative poem in three parts in which Hektorović describes in a letter to his cousin, his three-day boat trip from Hvar to Brač and Šolta, accompanied by a pair of Hvar fishermen, Paskoje Debelja and Nikola Zet.

As a literary piece Ribanje has been variously classified in Croatian literary history as an epistle, as a fishermen eclogue or epic poem, and at other times as a documentary travelogue.

== Content and analysis ==
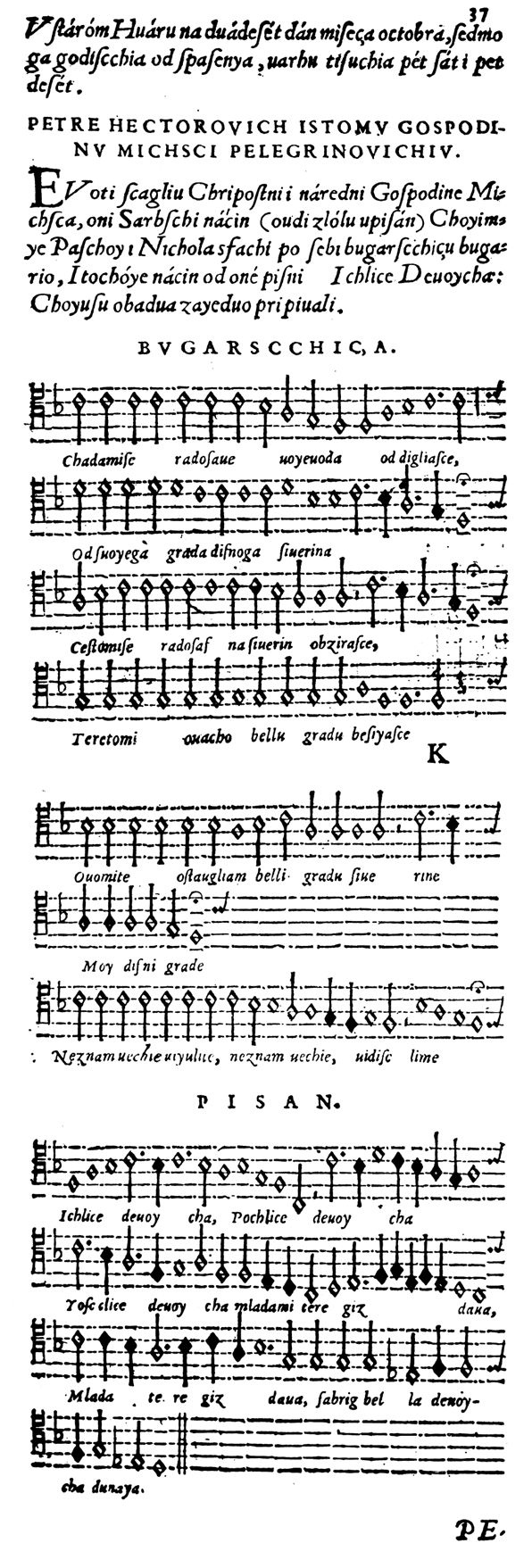
The score of two bugaršćicas recorded by Hektorović, "Kada mi se Radosave vojevoda" and "I kliče devojka", from the first edition of Ribanje, Venice, 1568

According to its content Ribanje is the first piece of Croatian literature written in verse in which travel is not described allegorically, but as a real journey, describing the beauties of nature and homeland. It's a travelogue of a Renaissance man who enjoys nature and considers it to be a refuge for man's spirit where it can achieve complete relaxation and invigoration. Ribanje is the first described tourist journey of a modern, Renaissance man in Croatian literature; it is a first piece of Croatian culture in which world is described by parameters of human's concrete, earthly needs. To sum it up, Ribanje is the first secular, mimetic, realistic travelogue of Croatian literature.

In the poem the narrator—the poet himself—describes his journey across Adriatic islands and recounts events that he and his co-travellers experienced along the path. The narrator, great aesthetic and sensitive to beauty, often describes the landscape the company sailed through, admiring the beauties of his homeland.

The descriptive accounts of Ribanje combine the narrative parts in which events of the journey are detailed, along with the fishermens' complaints, dialogues and conversations. The poet-narrator often cites the conversation of the fishermen, quoting the truth, as he sees it, of their wise sayings and intelligent conversations.

Hektorović meticulously recorded the songs sung by the fishermen along the way, making this one of the earliest examples in Croatian literature to include transcribed folk music within the text. There are two bugaršćicas and three short songs, toasts or honorific songs, sung alternatively by the fishermen. This makes Ribanje a work that makes an interesting and aesthetically valuable synthesis, a blending of artistic and folk literature.

== Translations ==
The work has been translated from Croatian to English as Fishing and fishermen's conversation by Edward Dennis Goy in 1979. In 1999 Matica hrvatska published a facsimile reprint of the edition princeps of Ribanje i ribarsko prigovaranje, with parallel translation to modern standard Croatian, conducted by Marko Grčić. The only two extant copies of the first edition are held at the library of Croatian Academy of Sciences and Arts.

== Movie adaptations ==
A feature film adaptation of the work by Croatian film director Milan Trenc, starring Rade Šerbedžija as Hektorović and Leon Lučev as Paskoje, was released in 2020.
