= Tvrdalj Castle =

Building in Stari Grad, Hvar, Croatia

Coordinates: 43.183°N 16.595°E

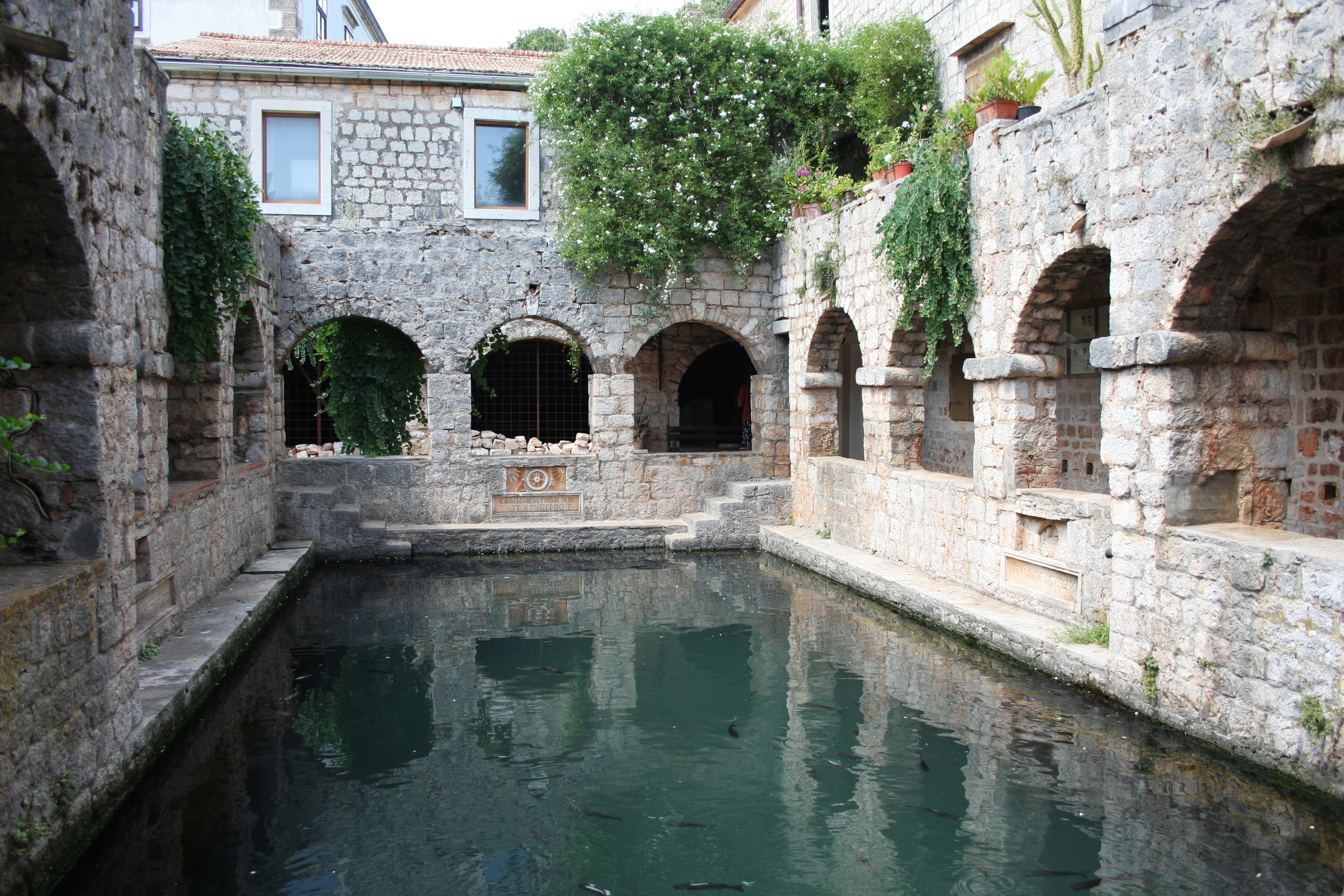
Fish pool in Tvrdalj

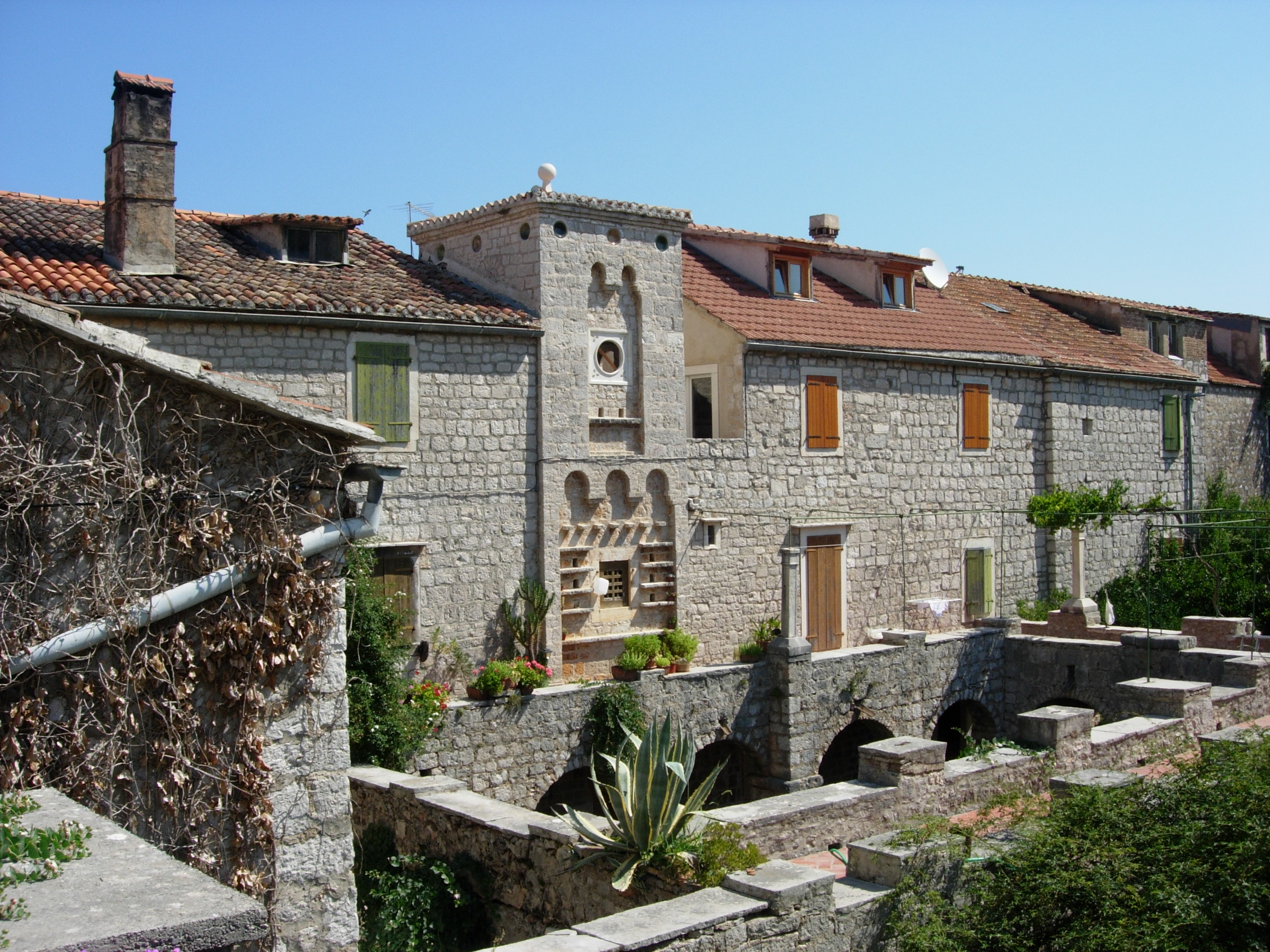
Interior

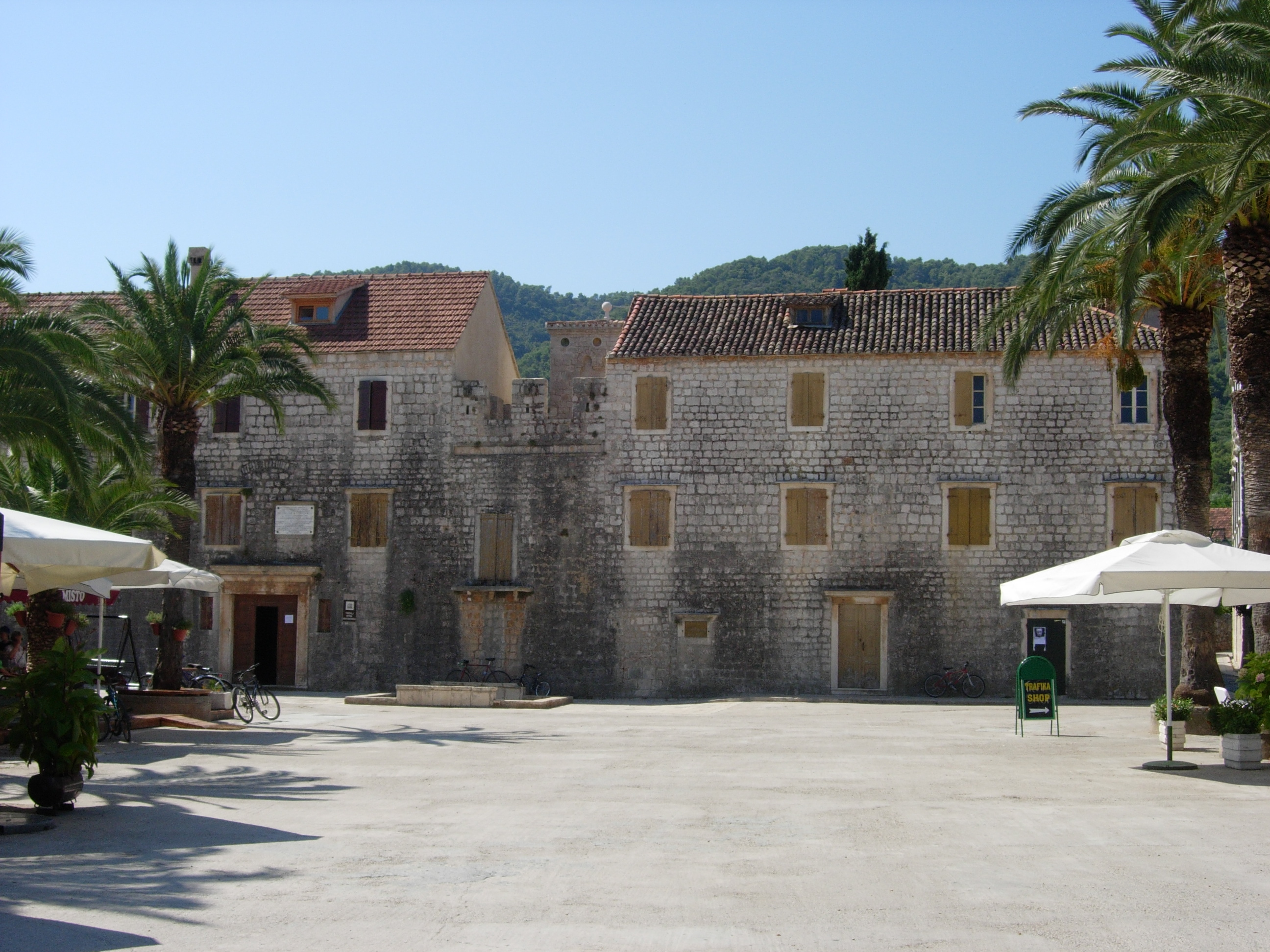
Facade

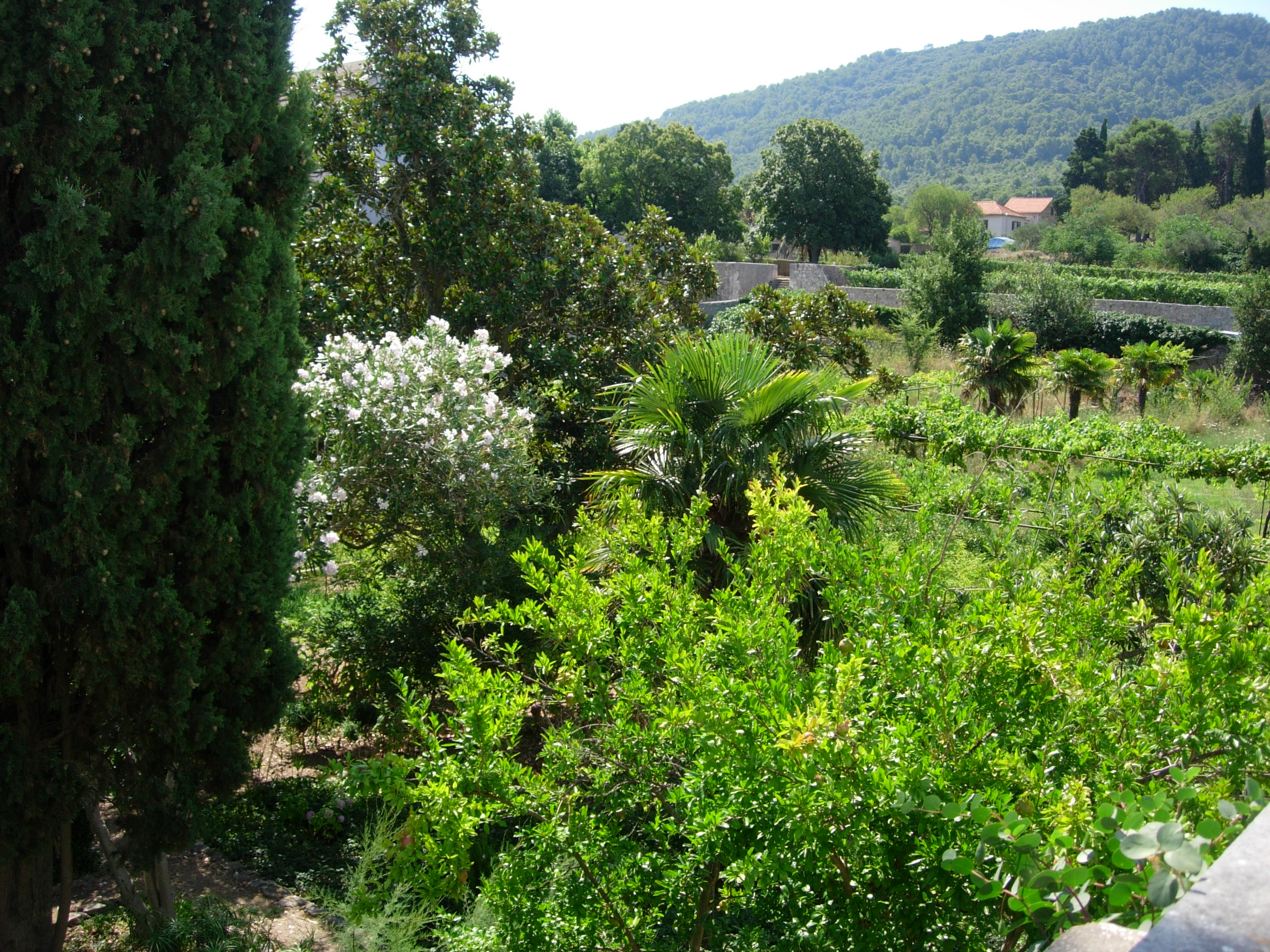
Garden

Tvrdalj Castle (Croatian: Gradina Tvrdalj) is a castle in Stari Grad, on the island of Hvar, Croatia.

Tvrdalj was the summer residence of Petar Hektorović, the Croatian poet (1487–1572). During the 16th century, the island of Hvar came under attack from the Ottoman Turks. Hektorović, one of the local nobles, undertook to fortify his house so that it could act as shelter for the local citizens.

Tvrdalj is a well-preserved Renaissance building, with a long closed facade on the seaward side, to protect it from attack. The interior courtyard contains a sea-water fish pool, enclosed by a vaulted and arcaded terrace. Next to it is a tower with a dovecote. The living quarters, together with the servant quarters, and several wells, are arranged around the pool. Behind the main buildings is a walled garden where Hektorović cultivated herbs and medicinal plants.

A series of inscriptions are set into walls of the mansion in Latin and Croatian. Those in Croatian are considered to be some of the oldest extant.

PETRVS HECTOREVS MARINI FILIVS
PROPRIO SVMPTV ET INDVSTRIA
AD SVVM ET AMICOR, VSVM CONSTRVXIT

Translation: Petar Hektorović, son of Marin, built this at his own expense and by his own efforts, for his own and his friends' use.

== History ==
In 1448, Hektor Hektorović was granted permission by the Hvar Governor (Hvarski Knez) to build on the land at Tvrdalj, in Osijek, Croatia at the far western edge of the town of Stari Grad, right on the shore of the bay. The location was already known as Tvrdalj which translates as a fortress or castle, implying an earlier fortification on the site. The area had been the site of occupation from ancient times, as demonstrated later by remains found during the 1898 excavations for the steps of the nearby church of Sv Rocco.

The late 15th century and into the 16th century was a time of expansion and building in Stari Grad. In 1482, the Dominican monastery was built, and many of the noble families on the island saw Old Hvar, as it was then called, as a peaceful haven. Many eminent figures had summer palaces built, so much so that in 1553 the Venetian correspondent Giustinian described Stari Grad as having "handsome buildings and a port fit for the largest of ships. Many fine people live there."

Following the death of his father, Marin Hektorović, Petar Hektorović took over the building and made Tvrdalj into his summer palace using his own architectural design. Although this was not his only house on the island, or even in Stari Grad, he mentioned it extensively in his will, explaining in architectural detail how to continue with the unfinished building works.

Petar Hektorović sited his residence directly on the waterfront, which in the 16th century was located further inland than today. The square that lies in front of Tvrdalj today did not exist until the 19th century. In Hektorović's time, there was a shallow stretch of seawater right up to the entrance, allowing access by boat. His fortified palace was built on the shore near to where the baths of a Roman country villa had once stood.

During the 1520s and 1530s, building work focused mainly on housing for travellers and the poor. However, an attack on Stari Grad by the Turks in 1539 left much of the town burned and ransacked and Hektorovic fled to Italy, returning in 1541 to resume work.

Hektorović's design for Tvrdalj was a simple layout of single story dwellings around a central courtyard. His house, kitchen and cellar opened onto the courtyard, which had a large rectangular fish pond. Above the pond was a tower, with dovecot. At the back of the property was a large walled garden. The main entry was through a baroque portal from the sea, where the inscription "OMNIUM CONDITORI" (To the Creator of the World) would greet arriving visitors. A stone recess in the atrium has a hole that was used for emptying chamber pots. Carved into the stone above this simple lavatory is "SI TE NOSTI CUR SUPERBIS" (Know what thou art, then why art thy proud?).

On the eastern side, with its own entrance, was housing for travellers and paupers. Under the terrace of the loggia, in a small cell lived a Beguine nun. A high wall surrounded the housing complex, with defensive features such as a ravelin, and an altana (rooftop loggia) with merlons.

The fish pond was created as a habitat for grey mullet, with a system to ensure a fresh supply of sea water. Above this is a small tower with the dovecot for birds, and a garden with flowers and trees for land animals. Hektorović himself said that his metaphysical construction began with the fishes in the pond, symbolizing Christ, and ended with the doves, which symbolized the holy spirit.

Tvrdalj was a simple summer residence, with none of the ornamentation or classical statues that mark other fashionable nobles houses of the time. Its defensive architecture gives it a distinctive appearance.

In 1571 Stari Grad was again attacked and Tvrdalj was set on fire by the Turks. A year later, Petar Hektorovic died and the damaged Tvrdalj was divided between his relatives. Following provisions in his will, there were gradual improvements made. However, in 1834 the Venetian laws lapsed and Tvrdalj experienced massive construction works: the south wall of the complex was removed, vaults constructed around the pool, a second floor added on either side of the tower, and new two-storey houses were built. The bay in front of Tvrdalj was filled in as part of the harbour improvements. In the 20th century, further major changes were experienced in 1901 when the eastern wall was demolished and houses built over the vault and cistern which is still part of the Tvrdalj entrance.

== Carved Inscriptions ==
Tvrdalj has numerous carved inscriptions in Latin, Croatian and Italian. These date from the original building by Peter Hektorović.

Location	Inscription	Translation
Above the entrance to the fish pond	PETRUS HECTOREUS MARINI FILIUS PROPRIO SUMPTU ET INDUSTRIA AD SUUM ET AMICORUM USUM CONSTRUXIT	Petar Hectorović, son of Marino, at his own expense and by his own effort built this for the use of himself and his friends
On a plaque in the wall under the arcade by the fish pond	FEDE E REALTA O QUANTO E BELLA	How beautiful faith and truth are!
On the south side of the fish pond	RESPICE QUOD SALVANT NEC OPES NEC GLORIA MUNDI NON DECOR AUT AETAS MORS QUIA CUNCTA RAPIT	Remember that neither riches nor fame, beauty nor age can save you from death, that takes all
On the east side of the fish pond	NIHIL OCCULTUM	Nothing is hidden Above the inscription is the imprint of plates and jugs that were once built into the wall
On the wall near the ethnographic collection	SI VIS AD VITAM INGREDI SERVA MANDATA	If you want to enter the spirit, observe this (If you want to enter into life, keep the commandments)
On the west side of the fish pond	CONNVENTIBUS VIRTUTE ET GENIO F.	Built by uprightness and skill working together The relief above the inscription has the symbols: two compasses, a wheel, and the faces of a man and woman radiating light
On the north side of the fish pond	MEMORARE NOVISSIMA	Remember what will come after
On the west side outer wall	HEU FUGIUNT FLUXU NON REDEUNTE DIES	Alas the days flow by like waves and do not return
On the front of the building	OMNIUM CONDITORI	Creator of all things
On the east side entrance (paupers and travellers)	MISLI KI ČTIŠ OVOJ // DVI STVARI KORISNE DA TE U VIČNJI ZNOJ // ZGRIŠANJE NE TISNE A TO DA Ć UMRITI // TER PUSTI ZLE ČUDI I NAPOKON PRITI // K BOGU DA TE SUDI	Let you who read this think on two important things in order that your sins do not force you into eternal suffering, and this that you will die so rid yourself of your evil ways and that finally you will stand before God who will judge you
On the east side corner	RES EX NOMINE	A thing from its name
On the lavatory wall	SI TE NOSTI CUR SUPERBIS	If thou knowest thyself then why art thou proud?

== Literature ==
- Gibbons, Wendy; Matulić, Vilma (2023). Nihil Occultum: Camera Obscura and Riddles at Hektorović's Tvrdalj Castle. Stari Grad: Muzej Starogo Grada. ISBN 978-953-8259-09-8.
