= Hanibal Lucić =

Croatian Renaissance poet and playwright

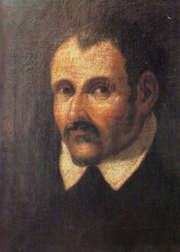
- Portrait of Hanibal Lucić
- Born: 1485; Hvar, Republic of Venice
- Died: 14 December 1553 (aged 68); Venice, Republic of Venice
- Occupations: Poet, playwright
- Writing career
- Period: Renaissance
- Notable works: Robinja; Jur nijedna na svit vila
- Literary movement: Renaissance

Hanibal Lucić (Croatian pronunciation: [xǎnibal lûtsitɕ]) or Annibale Lucio (c. 1485 – 14 December 1553) was a Croatian Renaissance poet and playwright, author of the first secular drama in Croatian.

== Biography ==
He was born to a Dalmatian noble family of Antun and Goja in Hvar, where he spent most of his life. Early in his youth, he was a judge and later became a lawyer of the Hvar municipality. As a witness of the Hvar Rebellion in 1510, he was forced to flee to Trogir and Split as he resisted the demands of the commoners. He had a disparaging stance towards the lower rebel peasantry, referring to them as "a bunch who have no thought".

His early literary work became associated with the translations of Ovid's work (Croatian: iz latinske odiće svukavši u našu harvacku priobukal). His writings are primarily recorded to be written in the Southern Čakavian dialect. He wrote the drama Robinja, the first South Slavic secular-themed play. His love poetry was influenced by Francesco Petrarca, but the Croatian folklore is also included in his work. His admiration towards the feminine figure plays an important role in most of his poems.

He was prone to self-criticism and had most of his work burned; the rest was salvaged and later published by his son Antonij. A collection of his work was published in 1556 (Skladanja).
