= The Slave Girl (play) =

1530 Croatian play by Hanibal Lucić

The Slave Girl Robinja
- Original language: Croatian
- Written by: Hanibal Lucić
- Characters: Robinja Derenčin; Matijaš, Derenčin's servant Ottoman pirate Mara; Pera; Anica Duke of Ragusa; Ragusan noble
- Genre: Drama; Comedy; Tragedy; Romance
- Setting: 16th century Croatia and Dalmatia, Dubrovnik

Premiere
- Date: c. 1530
- Place: Republic of Venice; Croatia

The Slave Girl (Croatian: Robinja) is a 1530 play by Croatian author Hanibal Lucić. It is considered to be the first original Croatian play and one of Europe's earliest secular dramas. The play is about a noble Croatian girl who becomes imprisoned by the Turks.

== Composition and sources ==
The play is divided in three acts. The play carries various influences, both foreign and local, as well as reflecting reality in Hvar and the surrounding Dalmatia. Croatian writer Veljko Barbieri considers the play to be the first European romance drama. The uniqueness of the play lies in its shifting from tragedy to comedy, from captivity to freedom and celebrations and freedom. The work is therefore regarded as containing elements of both a comedy, a tragedy and a pastoral.

== Synopsis ==
A certain noble girl, who is stated to be the daughter of Ban of Croatia Vlasko, becomes an orphan after her father dies during the war with the Ottomans. She is eventually captured and imprisoned by Ottoman pirates. She was greatly beloved by the King of Hungary, who offers a reward for anyone helping him to rescue her. Shortly after, a young knight, Derenčin (who is referred to variously as the grandson or nephew of another Ban of Croatia, also called Derenčin, likely Emerik Derenčin, who died in Battle of Krbava Field), embarks on an adventure for this purpose. After spending considerable time wandering, he finally finds her in Dubrovnik. There the pirates had brought her to sell her as a slave. Derenčin offers to pay 3000 ducats for her freedom, but first had to convince himself whether she still had feeling for him, or had forgotten him. He decides to dress as a merchant so she does not recognize him when he approaches her. He begins a conversation with her, requesting her life story, and she begins telling her tale from her father's death to her captivity. She had lived a leisurely life before, wore gilded dresses and people around her were courteous towards her. When she was kidnapped, she had to eat grass, drink water and walk barefoot. She also tells him about young Derenčin, who had confessed love to her, but she never reciprocated although feeling the same way towards him. She was angry at him for not coming to rescue her, despite his love confessions. After Derenčin finished listening to her story, he proposed buying her off and securing her freedom, but she had to marry him in exchange. She decides to accept his proposition, not knowing who he really is, releasing her and taking her to a nearby house for nourishment. He orders his servants to take good care of her. Next day a wedding took place, with the city's nobility and the Duke of Ragusa hastily sending gifts for future spouses. One noble, as he is handing the gift, personally thanks Derenčin for freeing the slave girl. Derenčin admits to the slave girl who he really is, for which she responds with great happiness. The duke has the final words, and Derenčin gives thanks to everyone.
