= Petar Zoranić =

Croatian writer

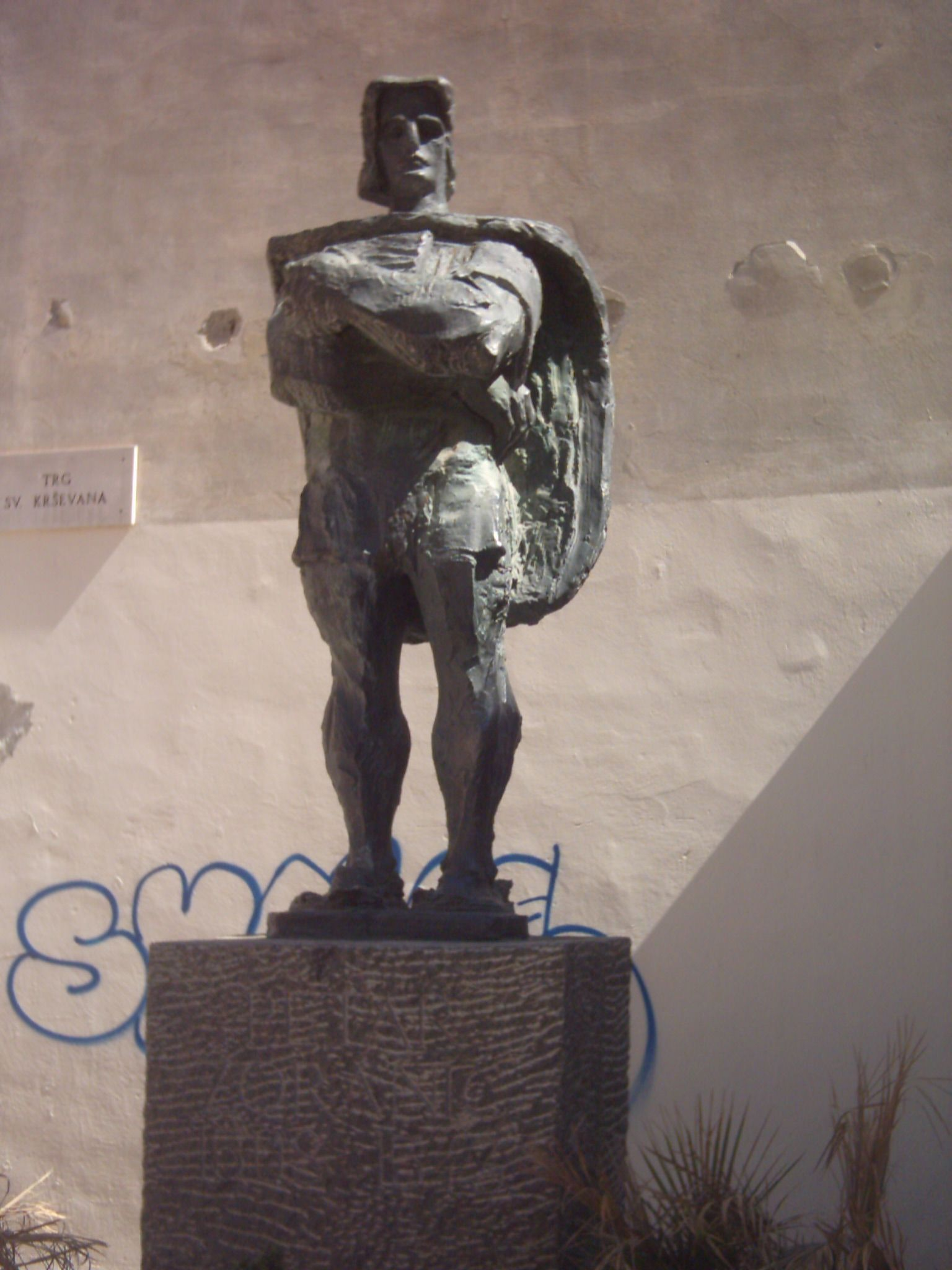
- Statue to Petar Zoranić
- Born: 1508; Zadar, Venetian Republic (now Zadar, Croatia)
- Died: 1569 (aged 60–61)
- Occupation: Writer
- Notable work: Planine

Petar Zoranić (1508 – before 1569) was a Croatian writer and poet from Zadar. He is most important as the author of Planine, regarded as the first Croatian novel. Pastoral in nature, the novel was written in 1538 and published in 1569. Zoranić wrote two other works, Ljubveni lov and Vilenica, but neither of these has survived.

== Biography ==
Petar Zoranić was born in 1508, as a descendant of an old noble family Tetačić from Nin, which moved to Zadar at the end of 15th century amidst Ottoman danger. At that time, his mother Elizabeth, was expecting a child. He is first mentioned in 1531, as a notary and judiciary, which probably implies that he previously enrolled as a law student. Because of lack of sources, it is not known in which year he died. He died somewhere between 1548 and 1569.

== Works ==
- Ljubveni lov
- Vilenica
- Planine (1532.)
