= Juraj Šižgorić =

Croatian poet from Venetian Dalmatia

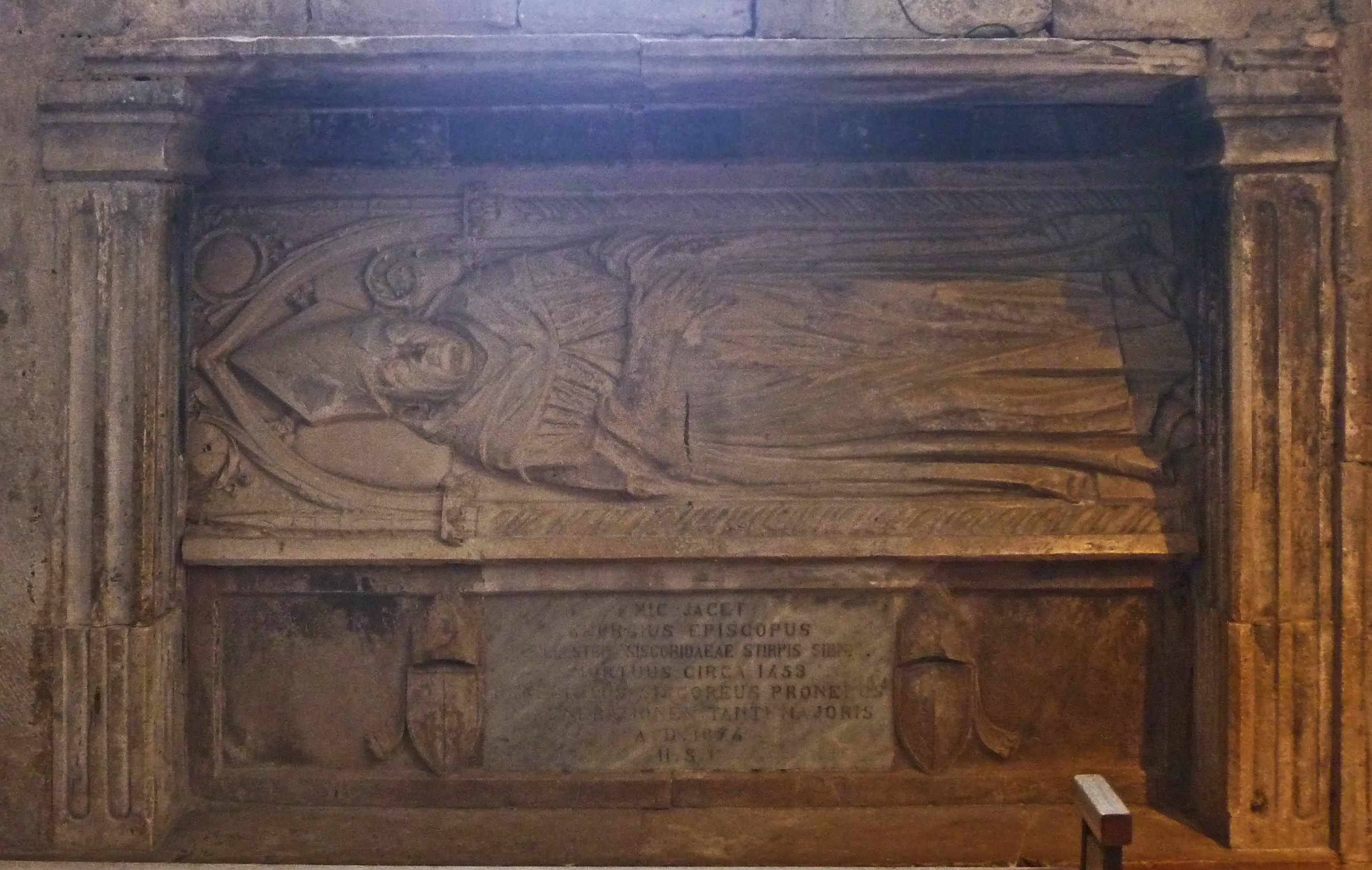
- Tomb of Juraj Šižgorić in the Cathedral of Šibenik
- Born: 13 September 1420 or 1445; Šibenik
- Died: 30 November 1509; Šibenik
- Other name: Georgius Sisgoreus
- Occupations: poet, priest

Juraj Šižgorić (Latin: Georgius Sisgoreus or Sisgoritus, ca. 1420/1445–1509) was a Croatian Latinist poet and priest from Venetian Dalmatia. He was the first humanist from Šibenik and the central personality of Šibenik's humanist circle and also one of the most important figures in 15th-century cultural life of the Croatian people.

== Life ==
There is not much information about Šižgorić's personal life. Born into a noble family that in the mid-14th century re-settled from the county of Luka in northern Dalmatia to Skradin and from there to Šibenik, he was one of at least three brothers. He studied at the University of Padua in Italy, where received a doctorate in canon law in 1471. After returning to his home city, he held the position of vicar general in the Diocese of Šibenik.

In 1462, alongside noblemen Jakov Naplavić and Petar Tolimerić, Šižgorić was on a diplomatic visit to Doge of Venice, Pasquale Malipiero, who accepted their request to publish a document from 1413 confirming the previous laws of Šibenik.

Marko Marulić in 1465–1466 wrote a Latin epistle, an encomium dedicated to Šižgorić. In his circle of home city friends was Ambroz Mihetić.

== Works ==
- His Elegiarum et carminum libri tres ("Book of elegies and poems", Venice, 1477) is considered the first published incunable (book) by a Croatian poet. It includes 62 poems.
- De diebus festis (calendar collection of poems). It also mentions Ottoman's attack on hinterland in 1468.
- An untitled collection of Latin poems, dated to 1487, remained unpublished as a manuscript until 1962.
- A historical-geographical discussion in prose De situ Illyriae et civitate Sibenici (1487). In it, most notably, mentions St. Jerome and that the Italians are trying to "steal him" from the Illyrians. In it is mentioned that along Jakov Naplavić/Naplavčić collected Croatian folk proverbs and translated them in Latin, but nothing was preserved of Dicteria illyrica.
- Unpublished threnody Prosopopeya edita per Georgium Sisgoreum Sibenicensem studentem Patauii.
