= Mavro Vetranović =

Ragusan writer

Mauro Vetrani
- Born: 1482; Ragusa, Republic of Ragusa
- Died: 1576
- Other name: Mauro Vetrani
- Occupations: writer and Benedictine monk

Mauro Vetrani (Croatian: Mavro Vetranović; 1482–1576) was a writer and Benedictine monk from Ragusa.

== Biography ==
Born in Ragusa (modern Dubrovnik), then the Republic of Ragusa, in 1482, he entered the Benedictine Order in 1507 on the island of Meleda (Mljet), and after a period of education in Monte Cassino in Italy returned to Meleda as the abbot of the monastery. In the 16th century, the monastery was the centre of the Meleda Congregation (Congregatio Melitensem or Melitanam), gathering all the monasteries of Benedictine monks in the area of the Republic of Ragusa, and Vetrani was the first president of the Congregation from 1544.

He wrote prolifically throughout his life, leaving a large body of work including prose, drama, religious and satirical poetry and an unfinished epic running to 4374 verses. In his writing he revealed himself to be a patriotic Ragusan who also might have shared some sort of identity with other Dalmatians.

Croatian academic Franjo Švelec has divided the work of Vetranović into three periods. In the first, up to the end of the 1520s, his topics were primarily youth and poetry with romantic and mythological themes. In the second, until the end of the 1540s, he was dominated by 'serious' themes. In the last, until the end of his life, he returned somewhat to the themes of his youth thus closing the circle of life and creative journey.

Modern-day sources credit him as part of Croatian literature.

== See also ==
- Republic of Ragusa
- Dubrovnik
