= Petar Hektorović =

Croatian writer and poet (1487–1572)

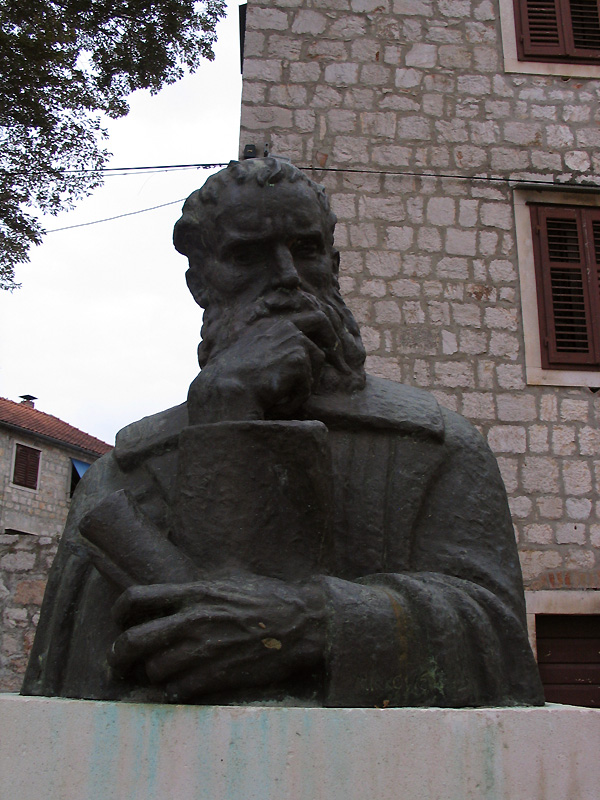
- A statue of Petar Hektorović in front of Tvrdalj in Stari Grad
- Born: 1487; Hvar, Republic of Venice
- Died: 13 March 1572 (aged 84–85); Hvar, Republic of Venice
- Other names: Pietro Ettoreo; Piero Hettoreo
- Occupations: poet and collector of Hvar's fishermen songs
- Notable work: Fishing and Fishermen's Talk

Petar Hektorović (1487 – 13 March 1572) was a Croatian writer and polymath.

Hektorović, also known as Pietro Ettoreo or Piero Hettoreo, was born and died in Stari Grad, Hvar. He was a poet and collector of Hvar's fishermen songs, and an important figure of the Renaissance period in Croatian literature. He also wrote in Latin and in Italian, in addition to the local Slavic language.

His major work Fishing and Fishermen's Talk (Ribanje i ribarsko prigovaranje, 1568), is a hybrid genre: simultaneously a travelogue, discourse in fishing, reflexive poem and poetic epistle. It is a treasure of Croatian maritime and zoological terminology, which has become incorporated in Croatian standard language.

As hybrid as Hektorović's works, so was his language: chiefly based on a local Chakavian dialect, but amalgamated with the idiom of Shtokavian writing poets from Dubrovnik with whom Hektorović has remained in close contact during his lifetime.

== See also ==
- Tvrdalj Castle, his home in Stari Grad
