= Rector (Ragusa) =

Head of Government of the Republic of Ragusa

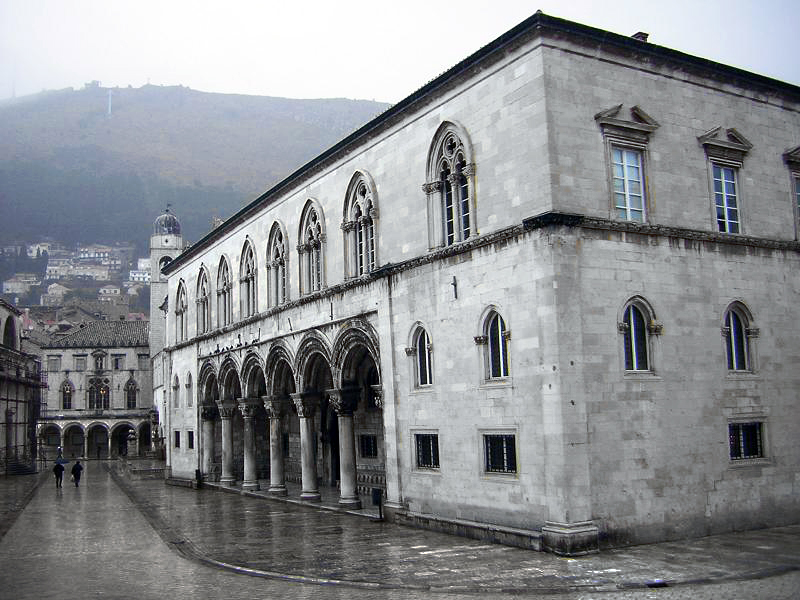
View of the Rector's Palace.

The rector (in Latin; Italian: rettore, Serbo-Croatian: knez) was an official in the government of the Republic of Ragusa. The holder was the head of the executive powers of Ragusa, part of the Small Council (Consilium minus). The rector was seated at the Rector's Palace.

== Partial list of rectors of Ragusa ==
13th century

- 1205 Damjan Juda

14th century

- 1358 Nikša Sorgo
- March 1358 Petar Ragnina
- 1358 Ivan Pavov Gundulić
- 1358 Marin Bona
- October 1358 Nikola Zavernego
- 1358 Marin Menze
- 1358 Marin Bona
- March 1359 Ivan Cereva
- July 1359 Nikša Sorgo
- August 1359 Ivan Bona
- 1359 Marin Gozze
- September 1359 Lovro Volcacio
- October 1359 Savino Bonda
- January 1360 Marin Bona
- March 1360 Jakov Menze
- April 1360 Ivan Cerva
- May 1360 Nikola Zavernego
- June 1360 Ivan Nikolin Gundulić
- July 1360 Ivan Pavov Gundulić
- August 1360 Nikola Grede
- September 1360 Ivan Bona
- October 1360 Lovro Volcasso
- November 1360 Nikola Sorgo
- December 1360 Petar Ragnina
- January 1361 Marin Gozze
- February 1361 Marin Bona
- March 1361 Marin Menze
- April 1361 Savino Bonda
- May 1361 Nikola Caboga
- June 1361 Ivan Cerieva
- July 1361 Nikola Saraca
- August 1361 Ivan Gundulić
- September 1361 Andrija Luccari
- October 1361 Nikola Zavernego
- November 1361 Vlaho Babalio
- December 1361 Nikola Grede
- January 1362 Lovro Volcasso
- February 1362 Ivan Bona
- March 1362 Jakov Menze
- April 1362 Marin Menze
- May 1362 Ivan Tudisio
- June 1362 Ivan Gundulić
- July 1362 Miho Držić
- September 1362 Ivan Gundulić
- October 1362 Broccardo Broccardi
- November 1362 Nikola Zavernego
- December 1362 Nikola Andrija Sorgo
- January 1363 Savino Bonda
- February 1363 Jakov Georgio
- March 1363 Nikola Grede
- April 1363 Lovro Volcasso
- May 1363 Marin Junije Menze
- June 1363 Vlaho Lučić
- July 1363 Ivan Nikola Gundulić
- August 1363 Petranja Bonda
- September 1363 Vlaho Babalio
- October 1363 Zoan Puzlo Gondula
- November 1363 Nikola Saraca
- December 1363 Grube Menze
- January 1364 Ivan Tudisio
- February 1364 Nifficus Galoc
- March 1364 Miho Babalio
- April 1364 Jakov Georgio
- May 1364 Šimun Slavov Resti
- June 1364 Pietro Prodanello
- July 1364 Marin Menze
- August 1364 Ivan Bona
- September 1364 Marin Gozze
- October 1364 Nikola Zavernego
- November 1364 Nikola Grede
- December 1364 Vlaho Babalio
- February 1366 Nifficus Galloc
- April 1366 Michael Babalio
- July 1366 Jakov Giorgio
- August 1366 Petragna Bonda
- September 1366 Orse Zamagna
- October 1366 Vlaho Babalio
- November 1366 Ivan Bona
- December 1366 Andrija Dobre Bincola
- January 1367 Marin Gozze
- March 1367 Petar Prodanello
- April 1367 Đuro Jakobov Giorgi
- May 1367 Michael Babalio
- June 1367 Grube Menze
- July 1367 Jakov Sorgo
- December 1367 Džore Giorgi
- July 1368 Vito Georgio
- May 1369 Andrija Bincola
- November 1369 Ivan Grede
- December 1369 Michael Babalio
- 1370 Marko Bobali
- August 1370 Marin Menze
- February 1371 Nikola Zavernego
- April 1371 Andrija Beneša
- May 1371 Petar Gundulić
- June 1371 Nikola Caboga
- July 1371 Andrija Dobre Bincola
- August 1371 Helia Bonda
- September 1371 Jakov Georgi
- January 1372 Bartol Tudisio
- February 1372 Matej Vitov Đurđević
- March 1372 Polo Baraba
- August 1372 Ivan Bona
- September 1372 Ivan Grede
- November 1372 Ivan Bona
- December 1372 Džore Georgio
- January 1373 Andrija Gundulić
- March 1373 Andrija Beneša
- 1373 Klement Toma Držić
- February 1374 Vlaho Menze
- March 1374 Pavao Baraba
- April 1374 Stijepo Sorgo
- May 1374 Marin Junije Menze
- June 1374 Jakov Sorgo
- September 1374 Ivan Grede
- October 1374 Jakov Menze
- January 1375 Bartol Tudisio
- April 1375 Petar Gundulić
- July 1375 Vlaho Grede
- August 1375 Bartol Tudisio
- November 1375 Jakov Sorgo
- January 1376 Bartol Tudisio
- February 1376 Vlaho Grede
- May 1376 Marin Menze
- July 1376 Petar Gundulić
- September 1376 Andrija Dobre Binciola
- October 1376 Jakov Menze
- March 1377 Vlaho Babalio
- July 1377 Bartol Tudisio
- 1377 Matej Vitov Đurđević
- September 1378 Ivan Grede
- October 1378 Bartol Tudisio
- November 1378 Vlaho Sorgo
- December 1378 Vlaho Babalio
- January 1379 Vito Gozze
- February 1379 Jakov Sorgo
- March 1379 Junio Sorgo
- April 1379 Andrija Sorgo
- May 1379 Marin Bodacia
- June 1379 Jakov Menze
- July 1379 Vlaho Babalio
- August 1379 Miho Martinusso
- September 1379 Jakov Sorgo
- October 1379 Marin Junije Menze
- November 1379 Michael Babalio
- December 1379 Andrija Sorgo
- January 1380 Vlaho Sorgo
- April 1380 Matej Vitov Đurđević
- May 1380 Bartol Tudisio
- June 1380 Marin Bocignollo
- December 1380 Bartol Tudisio
- May 1381 Miho Nicolice Martinusso
- August 1381 Bartol Tudisio
- September 1381 Luca Bona
- October 1381 Andrija Dobre Bingola
- November 1381 Luca Bona
- February 1382 Petar Gundulić
- March 1382 Stijepo Luccari
- April 1382 Miho Nikolice Martinusso
- May 1382 Andrija Dobre Binzolla
- December 1382 Bartol Tudisio
- June 1384 Nikola Menze
- December 1386 Luka Bona
- February 1387 Miho Martinusso
- May 1387 Ivan Grede
- July 1387 Luka Bona
- September 1387 Miho Nicolice Martinusso
- December 1387 Pavao Gundulić
- September 1388 Mateo Georgio
- November 1388 Luka Bona
- January 1389 Pavao Gundulić
- May 1389 Nikola Gundulić
- June 1389 Luka Bona
- October 1390 Pavao Gondula
- November 1390 Nikola Menze
- December 1390 Nikola Gondula
- January 1391 Luka Bona
- February 1391 Junio Sorgo
- March 1391 Raphael Gozze
- April 1391 Dimitrije Beneša
- May 1391 Jakov Gondula
- June 1391 Pavao Gondula
- July 1391 Volzo Babalio
- August 1391 Unuce Matessa
- September 1391 Andrija Menze
- October 1391 Unuce Matessa
- November 1391 Marin Bodacia
- January 1392 Andrija Dobre Binzolla
- February 1392 Junio Sorgo
- March 1392 Nikola Gondula
- April 1392 Mateo Georgio
- May 1392 Miho Babalio
- June 1392 Vlaho Sorgo
- July 1392 Marin Bodacia
- August 1392 Andrija Dobre Bincolla
- September 1392 Junije Giorgi de Trippe
- October 1392 Junio Sorgo
- November 1392 Nikola Gozze
- December 1392 Clemente Marini Gozze
- May 1394 Clemente Marini Gozze
- June 1394 Nikola Menze
- July 1394 Vlaho Sorgo
- 1395 Luka Bona
- February 1396 Luka Bona
- December 1396 Martin Rasti

15th century

- June 1402 Andrija Volčić
- August 1402 Ivan Volčić
- November 1403 Marin Bucignollo
- January 1404 Vlaho Sorgo
- February 1404 Luca Bona
- April 1405 Martholo Marini Cerva
- July 1405 Ivan Volčić
- September 1405 Miho Luccari
- March 1406 Aloysius Gozze
- July 1407 Marin Bodacia
- April 1408 Šimun Bona
- June 1408 Marin Martholi Bucignollo
- August 1408 Božo Procullo
- December 1408 Raphaele Goze
- January 1409 Marin Bona
- February 1409 Stijepo Luccari
- June 1409 Marin Martholi Bucignolo
- October 1409 Matej Gradi
- November 1409 Paskval Resti
- April 1410 Michael Menze
- July 1410 Teodoro Prodanello
- August 1410 Klement Bodacia
- 1410 Alojz Gozze
- October 1410 Božo Proculo
- November 1410 Ursio Zamagno
- January 1411 Jakov Gundulić
- July 1411 Aloysio Gozze
- August 1411 Clemente Bodacia
- September 1411 Nikola Ragnina
- December 1411 Marin Cerva (acting)
- 1411 Francho Basilio (acting)
- February 1412 Paskval Resti
- July 1412 Andrija Sorgo
- October 1412 Nikola Gozze
- December 1412 Lampre Sorgo (during illness: Gauce Pozza)
- December 1412 Mateo Gradi
- January 1413 Šimun Gozze
- March 1413 Stijepo Lucari
- June 1413 Miho Menze
- October 1413 Lodovico Gozze
- November 1413 Niko Pozza
- January 1415 Ivan Volčić
- 1415 Teodor Prodanello (acting for Volčić)
- January 1417 Paskval Resti
- July 1417 Raphael Gozze
- December 1417 Volce Bobali
- September 1418 Marin Junije Gundulić
- June 1419 Paskval Resti
- July 1419 Lovro Sorgo
- August 1419 Theodoro Prodanello
- September 1419 Nalcho Georgio
- November 1419 Ivan Volčić
- December 1419 Andrija Martoli Volčić
- January 1420 Junio Georgio
- May 1420 Nikola Pozza
- July 1420 Martholo Cerva
- August 1420 Nikola Pozza
- October 1420 Michael Sorgo
- December 1420 Marin Sorgo
- January 1421 Marin Resti
- February 1421 Marin Junije Gradić
- May 1421 Marin Jakov Gundulić
- July 1421 Petar Luccari
- August 1421 Gauze Pozza
- November 1421 Ivan Marin Gozze
- December 1421 Džore Palmota
- January 1422 Vlaho Sorgo
- February 1422 Paskval Resti
- March 1422 Božo Proculo
- April 1422 Nikola Goze
- June 1422 Klement Resti
- July 1422 Nalcho Georgio
- September 1422 Nikola Petarv Pozza
- October 1422 Thome Bona
- November 1422 Lampre Sorgo
- December 1422 Benedetto Gundulić
- January 1423 Andrija Martoli Volčić
- February 1423 Junije Georgio
- April 1423 Mateo Gradi
- May 1423 Clemente Bodacia
- June 1423 Marin Gundulić
- September 1423 Raphael Gozze
- October 1423 Nikola Pozza
- November 1423 Martholo Cerva
- December 1423 Ivan Marinov Gozze
- January 1424 Marin Junije Gradi
- February 1424 Marin Gradi
- March 1424 Marin Petri Cerva
- 1424 Nalcho Georgio (acting)
- May 1424 Ursio Zamagno
- June 1425 Ivan Gundulić
- September 1425 Andrija Vlahov Menze
- May 1426 Martholo Zamagna
- July 1426 Dobre Bincola
- November 1426 Džore Palmota
- December 1426 Džore Gozze
- March 1427 Toma Bona
- August 1427 Paskval Resti
- October 1427 Volzo Babalio
- January 1428 Nikola P Pozza
- March 1428 Nikola Marini Gozze
- August 1428 Vito Klement Resti
- October 1428 Petar Luccari
- December 1428 Džore Palmota
- January 1429 Andrija Martin Volčić
- March 1429 Clemente Bodacia
- October 1429 Paskval Resti
- December 1430 Vito Resti
- January 1431 Božo Proculo
- February 1431 Ivan Gozze
- June 1431 Petar Sorgo
- July 1431 Niko Ivan Pozza
- August 1431 Ivan Jakov Gundulić
- October 1431 Nikola Georgio
- November 1431 Ivan Andrija Volčić
- June 1432 Frederic Gozze
- November 1432 Martolo Cerva
- December 1432 Miho Cerva
- February 1433 Petar Bona (acting)
- March 1433 Paladin Gundulić
- April 1433 Andrija Volčić
- June 1433 Matej Croce
- October 1433 Ivan Gozze
- December 1433 Marin Gundulić
- February 1434 Ivan Volčić
- October 1434 Aloysio Gozze
- April 1435 Michael Cerva
- January 1436 Gauze Pozza
- March 1436 Ivan Volčić
- June 1436 Martholo Zamagno
- August 1441 Andrija Babalio
- July 1442 Nikola Caboga
- August 1442 Toma Sorgo
- September 1442 Jakov Georgio
- December 1442 Mateo Gradi
- January 1443 Župan Bona
- March 1443 Ivan Volčić
- April 1443 Nikola Pozza
- May 1443 Nikola Matei Georgio
- September 1443 Marin Bona
- October 1443 Marin Ju. Georgio
- December 1443 Damjan Menze
- February 1444 Andrija Babalio
- March 1444 Mihovil Bocignolo
- May 1444 Junio Mato Gradi
- October 1444 Ivan Menze
- January 1445 Vlaho Ragnina
- February 1445 Župan Bona
- March 1445 Vito Resti
- April 1445 Petar Bona
- June 1446 Marin Bona
- November 1446 Antun Gozze
- April 1447 Toma Sorgo
- December 1447 Vlaho Ragnina
- January 1449 Alojz Gozze
- February 1449 Nikola Marin Caboga
- May 1449 Sigismondo Georgio
- March 1450 Junije Dobre Calich
- November 1450 Martolo Zamagno
- December 1450 Ivan Matej Georgio
- March 1451 Stjepo Zamagno
- 1452 Bartol Gozze
- September 1453 Ivan Martin Cerva
- October 1453 Nikola Pauli Gundulić
- December 1453 Junije Calich
- July 1454 Nikolin Basegli
- August 1454 Nikola Matej Giorgi
- August 1456 Lovro Ragnina
- February 1457 Nikolin Basegli
- April 1457 Damjan Menze
- 1457 Župan Bona
- February 1460 Ivan Andrija Volčić
- April 1460 Junije Matej Gradi
- December 1460 Andrija Resti
- April 1465 Vladislav Gozze
- September 1465 Vlaho Babalio
- December 1476 Raphael Marin Gozze
- 1481 Dragoe Gozze
- 1490 Michael Pozza
- 1490 Nicho Junius Georgio
- 1490 Dragoe Aloisius Gozze
- 1490 Climento Marin Gozze
- March 1490 Paladin Gundulić
- June 1490 Nikola Marin Luccari
- July 1490 Orsat Marin Bona
- September 1490 Nikolin Martolo Cerva
- October 1490 Maro Martholo Giorgi
- November 1490 Naocho Nikola Saraka
- December 1490 Nikola Ruschus Pozza
- January 1491 Orsolin Nikola Vlachussa Menze
- 1492 Stijepo Gradi

16th century

- 1501 Ivan Gozze
- 1500 – 1501 Giunio Andrea Bobali
- 1501 Šimun Beneša
- 1501 – 1502 Brno Bona
- 1503 - 1504 Junije Andrija Bobali
- 1504 Šimun Beneša
- 1505 - 1506 Frano Andrija Bobali
- 1506 – 1507 Giunio Andrija Bobali
- 1509 - 1510 Luca Bona
- 1510 Antun Bona
- October 1511 Helius Cerva
- 1511 - 1512 Antun Bona
- 1514 - 1515 Antun Bona
- 1515 Sigismund Bonifacius Giorgi
- 1517 - 1518 Antun Bona
- 1520 - 1521 Antun Bona
- 1521 Jakov Bunić
- December 1521 Šiško Menčetić
- 1522 - 1523 Bartolo Bona
- 1523 Antun Bona
- 1523 Jakov Bunić
- 1524 Šiško Menčetić
- 1525 - 1526 Luigi Bona
- 1526 Stijepo Gradi (died in office)
- 1526 Bartolo Bona
- 1526 Antun Bona
- 1526 Jakov Bunić
- August 1527 Damianus Joannis Menze
- 1527 - 1528 Luigi Bona
- 1528 - 1529 Mato Franov Bobali
- 1529 - 1530 Luigi Bona
- 1530 Frano Bona
- 1530 Marin Zamagna
- 1530 Jakov Bunić
- January 1530 Ivan Paladini Gundulić
- 1530 - 1531 Miho Junije Bobali
- December 1531 Damjan Beneša
- 1532 Frano Bona
- 1532 Jakov Bunić
- 1532 – 1533 Luigi Bona
- August 1534 Damjan Beneša
- 1535 Mato Franov Bobali
- 1535 Luigi Bona
- 1535 Frano Bona
- 1535 - 1536 Župan Bona
- 1536 Girolamo Bona
- 1536 Miho Šimun Bobali
- 1537 Frano Bona
- February 1537 Damjan Beneša
- 1538 Mato Franov Bobali
- 1538 - 1539 Frano Bona
- 1539 Ilija Bona
- 1539 Girolamo Bona
- 1539 - 1540 Mato Franov Bobali
- 1540 Šimun Bobali
- 1540 Pasko Cerva
- 1542 - 1543 Miho Giunio Bobali
- 1543 Pasko Cerva
- 1543 - 1544 Mato Franov Bobali
- 1545 - 1546 Miho Šimun Bobali
- 1545 Marin Gučetić
- 1546 – 1547 Mato Franov Bobali
- 1546 Pasko Cerva
- 1547 Bernardo Bona
- 1547 Marin Zamagna
- 1547 – 1548 Župan Bona
- January 1549 Mato Franov Bobali
- 1549 Paskal Frano Cerva
- 1549 Pasko Cerva
- 1551 Ivan Marinov Gundulić
- 1552 Pasko Cerva
- December 1552 Serafin Bona
- 1554 Bernard Cerva
- 1555 Župan Bona
- 1555 Pasko Cerva
- 1555 Lucijan Bona
- 1557 Marin Gučetić
- 1558 Pasko Cerva
- 1559 Jeronim Sigismund Bobali
- 1559 Junije Miho Bobali
- 1559 Lucijan Bona
- 1560 Luka Mihov Bona
- 1560 Marin Bona
- 1561 - 1562 Giunio Miho Bobali
- 1562 Lovro Mihajlo Bobali
- 1562 - 1563 Šimun Bobali
- 1564 - 1565 Lovro Miho Bobali
- 1565 Junije Mihajlo Bobali
- April 1566 Ivan Marinov Gundulić
- 1567 Giorgio Menze
- 1567 Marin Cerva
- 1568 - 1569 Junije Mihajlo Bobali
- 1568 Rado Gučetić
- 1569 Marin Cerva
- 1570 Lovro Mihajlo Bobali
- 1570 – 1571 Jakov Antun Beneša
- 1571 Marin Cerva
- 1571 Luka Jako Cerva
- June 1571 Frano Jeronim Gundulić
- 1571 – 1572 Giunio Miho Bobali
- 1572 - 1573 Jakov Antun Beneša
- 1573 - 1575 Giunio Miho Bobali
- 1574 Junije Bona
- 1575 Jakov Antun Beneša
- December 1575 Ivan Marinov Gundulić
- 1576 Luka Jako Cerva
- 1576 Giorgio Menze
- 1576 - 1577 Antun Bona
- 1577 Girolamo Ghetaldi
- September 1577 Frano Jeronim Gundulić
- 1577 - 1578 Natalio Proculo
- 1578 Bernard Cerva
- February 1578 Ivan Marinov Gundulić
- 1578 Marin Bona
- 1578 – 1579 Jakov Antun Beneša
- 1579 - 1580 Antun Bona
- 1580 Vladimir Menze
- 1580 Luciano di Girolamo Bona
- 1580 Junije Bona
- 1581 Jeronim Caboga
- February 1581 Ivan Marin Gundulić
- 1581 Trojan Cerva
- May 1583 Frano Jeronim Gundulić
- 1584 Trojan Cerva
- 1584 Ivan Marinov Gundulić
- 1587 – 1588 Ivan Binciola
- 1588 - 1589 Matteo Beneša
- 1589 Rado Gučetić
- 1589 Petar Beneša
- 1589 Lujo Saraca
- 1589 Petrus Cerva
- 1591 Jero Bucchia
- 1592 Lujo Saraca
- 1594 Miho Bunić Babulinović
- 1600 Andro Luccari

17th century

- 1601 Antun Orsatov Gundulić
- 1602 Sabo Menze
- 1603 Marin Tudisi
- December 1603 Giorgio Mar Gozze
- ?-? Dinko Ranjina (7 times)
- ?-? Nikola Vitov Gučetić (7 times)
- 1611 Frano Caboga
- 1612 – 30 January 1612 Šiško Giorgi (died in office)
- February 1612 Vladislav Menze
- 1612 Vlaho Gundulić
- March 1612 Rafael Bona
- 1613 Jakov Luccari
- 1614 Marin Sorgo
- 1615 Stijepo Prodanello
- 1616 Stjepan Proculo
- 1617 Lamprica Cerva
- August 1617 Miho Bunić Babulinović (died in office)
- 1618 Jero Bona
- 1619 Niko Gozze
- 1620 Frano Sorgo
- 1621 Toma Basilio
- 1621 Ivan Palmotić
- 1622 Đivo Menze
- 1623 Ivan Clasci
- December 1623 Frano Gundulić
- June 1624 Ivan Palmotić
- 1625 Miho Sorgo
- May 1627 Ivan Palmotić
- May 1630 Ivan Palmotić
- 1630 Jero Gozze
- 1630 Marin Menze
- 1631 Đivo Nika Gundulić
- July 1633 Ivan Palmotić
- January 1636 Ivan Palmotić
- May 1639 Ivan Palmotić
- 1639 Simone Menze
- 1640 Pavo Pozza
- 1641 Džono Restić
- May 1642 Ivan Palmotić
- 1642 Luca Sorgo
- 1642 Ivan Bunić Vučić
- 1643 Pavo Pozza
- May 1645 Ivan Palmotić
- 1645 Ivan Bunić Vučić
- 1648 Ivan Bunić Vučić
- ?-? Ivan Marinov Gundulić
- 1651 Luciano Caboga
- 1651 Ivan Bunić Vučić
- 1652 Luca Sorgo
- 1653 Savino Bona
- 1654 Frano Ghetaldi
- 1655 Marino Proculo
- 1657 Ivan Bunić Vučić
- 1660 Luko Gozze
- 1661 Marino Proculo
- 1662 Pavao Menze
- 1662 Frano Sigismund Sorgo
- 1663 Benedicto Bona
- 1664 Simeone Menze
- 1665 Luka Restić
- 1667 - 6 Apr 1667 Šišmundo Getaldić (died in office)
- May 1667 Nicola Bassegli
- 1667 Miho Menze
- 1670 Marino Sorgo
- July 1670 Šiško Gundulić
- 1671 Ivan Matej Ghetaldi
- 1671 Nikola Bona
- April 1671 Jaketa Palmotić Dionorić
- 1672 Girolamo Menze
- 1674 Nikola Bona
- July 1674 Jaketa Palmotić Dionorić
- July 1676 Šiško Gundulić
- December 1676 Mato Gundulić
- 1677 Nikola Bona
- September 1678 Mato Gundulić
- August 1679 Šiško Gundulić
- 1680 Clemenens Menze
- 1681 Mato Bona
- June 1681 Mato Gundulić
- September 1682 Šiško Gundulić (died in office)
- 1682 Nicola Binciola
- 1683 Clemenens Menze
- April 1684 - 23 April 1684 Mato Gundulić (died in office)
- 1684 Stijepo Tudisio
- September 1688 Rafael Vladislavov Gozze
- October 1690 Mato Marinov Bona
- November 1690 Rafael Vladislavov Gozze
- January 1691 Pavao Vladislavov Gozze
- April 1691 - 22 Apr 1691 Junius Cerva (died in office)
- 1692 Lovrijenac Sorgo
- 1693 Rafael Gozze
- 1694 Ivan Karla Sorga
- 1695 Jero Menze
- August 1695 Stjepan Bozov Proculo
- 1696 Dominko Bucchia
- 1696 Vladislav Bucchia
- 1697 Marin Sorgo (died in office)
- 1697 Vladislav Gozze
- 1699 Đivo Šiškov Gundulić
- 1699 Vladislav Bona

18th century

- 1701 Mato Marov Bona
- 1702 Mato Marov Bona
- 1703 Junius Gozze
- 1703 Mato Marov Bona
- 1706 Ivan Menze
- 1707 Frano Tudisi
- 1708 Junius Gozze
- 1709 Ivan Menze
- 1710 Luca Marini Sorgo
- ?-? Ivan Sarov Bona (3 times)
- 1726 Ivan Gozze
- February 1721 Serafin Bunić-Vučičević
- 1726 – 27 March 1726 Vladislav Bucchia (died in office)
- 1727 Ivan Basilio
- 1728 Vladislav Sorgo
- 1729 Ivan Gozze
- 1730 Giunio Resti
- 1733 Vladislav Gozze
- 1739 Vladislav Gozze
- 1752 Vlaho Menčetić
- 1754 Jakov Basiljević
- 1755 Đivo Buća
- 1756 Marin Brnov Caboga
- 1757 Luka Mihov Bona
- 1757 Niko Gozze
- 1758 Baldo Buća
- 1759 Orsat Cerva
- 1761 Dživo Sorgo
- 1762 Mato Zamagna
- 1763 Miho Zamagna
- 1763 Balthazar Gozze
- 1764 Nicola Proculo
- 1765 Luca Giorgi
- 1767 Antun Resti
- 1768 Savino Giorgi
- 1769 Serafino Sorgo
- 1769 Marino Tudisio
- 1770 Marino Natalio Sorgo
- 1770 Ivan Raphaelle Gozze
- 1771 Marin Tudisio and Frano Savino Ranjina
- ?-? Ivan Franatica Sorkočević (2 times)
- 1773 Nicola Proculo
- 1774 Lukša Giorgi-Bona
- 1775 Martolica Božidarević
- 1776 Luka Zamagna
- 1777 Balthazar Gozze
- 1778 Luka Mihov Bona
- 1786 Andrija Pavlić
- 1787 Marin Tudisio
- 1797 Marino Georgi
- 1797 Giunio Resti
- 1798 Ivan Basilio
- 1798 Klement Menze
- 1798 Antonio Marin Caboga
- 1798 Matteo Zamagna
- 1798 Orsat Gozze (died in office)
- 1800 Raphael Gozze
- 1800 Marino Bona
- ?-? Antun-Bernard Mihov Giorgi-Bona (16 times)
- ?-? Bernard Marin Caboga (23 times)

19th century

- 1801 Frano Gozze
- 1802 Matteo Ghetaldi
- 1802 Martolica Cerva
- 1802 Mato Ghetaldi
- 1803 Vlaho Điva Bona
- 1804 Đivo Vlaha Bona
- 1804 Miho Bona
- 1805 Mato Ghetaldi
- 1805 Vlaho Điva Bona
- 1806 Đivo Pijerka Natali
- 1807 Giunio Resti
- 28 December 1807 - 31 Jan 1808 Sabo Giorgi

== Sources ==
- Susan Mosher Stuard (1992). A state of deference: Ragusa/Dubrovnik in the medieval centuries. University of Pennsylvania Press. ISBN 978-0-8122-3178-6.
- Francis W. Carter (1972). Dubrovnik (Ragusa): A Classic City-state. Seminar Press. ISBN 978-0-12-812950-0.
- Robin Harris (January 2006). Dubrovnik: A History. Saqi Books. ISBN 978-0-86356-959-3.
