= Libertas (film) =

- Theatrical release poster
- Directed by: Veljko Bulajić
- Written by: Feđa Šehović; Ivo Brešan; Mirko Kovač; Veljko Bulajić
- Produced by: Aleksandar Črček
- Starring: Sven Medvešek; Sandra Ceccarelli; Goran Grgić; Radko Polič
- Cinematography: Slobodan Trninić; Vanja Černjul; Živko Zalar
- Music by: Đelo Jusić
- Production companies: Libertas; Tuna Film; Jadran Film; Croatian Radiotelevision; DDC Film; RAI
- Release date: 1 July 2006 (Croatia)
- Running time: 130 minutes
- Country: Croatia
- Languages: Croatian, Venetian
- Budget: HRK 42 million (US$ 3.6 million)

Libertas is a 2006 Croatian-Italian co-production film directed by Veljko Bulajić. It is a biographical film about the 16th-century playwright Marin Držić and his conflict with authorities of the Republic of Ragusa.

The film marked the return of the veteran director Veljko Bulajić after a 17-year break. Following a long and troubled production, it was released to high expectations, but did not meet a favorable reception from either the critics or the box office.

== Plot ==
The film is set in mid-16th century, at a time when the entire eastern Mediterranean is dominated by two great empires, the Ottoman Empire and the Republic of Venice, with the small but wealthy maritime republic of Ragusa (modern-day Dubrovnik) managing to maintain its independence through diplomatic agreements.

The film opens with a scene of playwright Marin Držić's (Sven Medvešek) comedy Dundo Maroje being staged in front of the Rector's Palace in Dubrovnik, during the traditional Feast of St. Blaise. Local aristocrats, ambassadors and the Rector himself (Miše Martinović) are attending the performance of the comedy play, which is an allegory about the hypocrisy and injustice of high society. The verses spoken on stage are met with disapproval by the noblemen present, and lead to the Rector getting up and leaving during the performance.

The Ragusan grey eminence, state censor Luka (Goran Grgić), decides to use this opportunity to crack down on Držić's company. Luka first confronts his patron Lord Zamagna (Radko Polič), a nobleman and former vice-admiral of the mighty Ragusan trade fleet. Luka charges him with conspiracy and gets him arrested. Zamagna's daughter Deša (Sandra Ceccarelli), a noblewoman and wife of the Spanish ship-owner De Cabrera, unsuccessfully tries to free her father, who eventually dies in a Ragusan dungeon.

Enraged by her father's demise, Deša joins the anti-government conspirators led by Lord Bučinić (Ljubomir Kerekeš) who plot against the Senate (the Ragusan parliament), and, hoping to gain political support abroad, leaves for the Duchy of Florence, itself a powerful city-state in Tuscany in present-day Italy. Despite repression, Držić's company continues to stage plays and provoke local authorities.

The Senate gets increasingly intolerant to any form of criticism and the company soon find themselves in a difficult situation - as the censors had decided to sanction Držić's thinly veiled criticisms by increasing taxes on his stage productions, the company amasses a huge debt which leads to seizures of their property. Because of this, his close friend, actor Lukarević (Žarko Potočnjak), decides to leave Ragusa and emigrates to Florence.

Although Držić gains some support from his friend the poet Mavro Vetranović (Vlatko Dulić), he also comes into conflict with his brother Vlaho Držić (Livio Badurina), an acclaimed painter who openly supports the Senate's authority. Staying true to his libertarian beliefs, and unable to continue his work, Držić also decides to join the conspiracy and leaves for Florence. After reaching Tuscany, Držić mingles with other Ragusan exiles, including Lukarević and Deša Zamagna. Inspired by the progressive society of 16th-century Tuscany, Držić pens a draft of a new Ragusan statute, which he titles Libertas (Latin for "liberty"), which enshrines the freedoms of speech and creative expression.

Lord Bučinić, in an attempt to gain support for the conspirators' cause, tries to use Deša's and Držić's reputation in Florence and instructs them to turn to Cosimo I de' Medici (Andrea Buscemi), the Duke of Florence, but to no avail as he ignores their pleas. Meanwhile, the Ragusan authorities hire mercenaries to track down and assassinate them all. Ignored by Cosimo I, the plot is effectively terminated as spies locate and execute Bučinić and Lukarević. Držić and Deša then decide to escape to Venice, hoping to find refuge in the city in which several of his works had been published, and that the Doge of Venice might be more understanding to their plight.

During their perilous journey, the friendship between them develops into a romance. Arriving in Venice, they try to hide but are nevertheless found by assassins. A manhunt through Venetian streets and bridges ensues, in which Držić deliberately draws the pursuers to himself to lure them away from Deša, before escaping by jumping into a canal. At dawn the following day, Držić is washed ashore. Exhausted and frozen, he is found by the city guards and taken to the poorhouse. As he floats between life and death in delirium he sees his ideals becoming reality. In the final scene, undertakers put his casket on a gondola, which floats away across the lagoon.

== Cast ==
- Sven Medvešek as Marin Držić, a Croatian Renaissance playwright. Originally, the primary candidate for the lead role was Medvešek's older brother Rene, while Sven Medvešek was cast as Vlaho Držić, Marin Držić's brother, a role that eventually went to Livio Badurina.
- Sandra Ceccarelli as Countess Desa Zamagna (alternatively spelled "Deša Zamanja", a Ragusan noblewoman of the House of Džamanjić), daughter of Držić's patron, and later his lover during his exile in Florence
- Žarko Potočnjak as Lukarević, a theatre actor and friend of Držić
- Goran Grgić as Luka, the Ragusan state censor and the main antagonist
- Radko Polič as Lord Zamagna (or "gospar Zamanja"), Ragusan nobleman, father of Deša and patron of Držić, who dies in prison after being charged with high treason by the state censor Luka
- Andrea Buscemi as Cosimo I de' Medici, the Duke of Florence who Držić asks for help in overthrowing the Ragusan government
- Vlatko Dulić as Mavro Vetranović, a Ragusan Benedictine friar and writer who supports Držić and his work publicly
- Miše Martinović as the Rector of Ragusa

== Production ==
The film had a remarkably long and troubled development history. In a 1992 competition for funding by the Croatian Ministry of Culture, the film was accepted under the working title "Project Libertas". However, personal and political animosities towards the director kept the project in limbo for eight years. By 2000, Bulajić had recruited Ivo Brešan, Mirko Kovač and Feđa Šehović as screenwriters, as well as Vlado Ožbolt as a scenographer, but had not yet decided on the cast. At the time, the film's budget was estimated at HRK 12 million (US$ 1.4 million), and the start of the shooting was planned for late 2000.

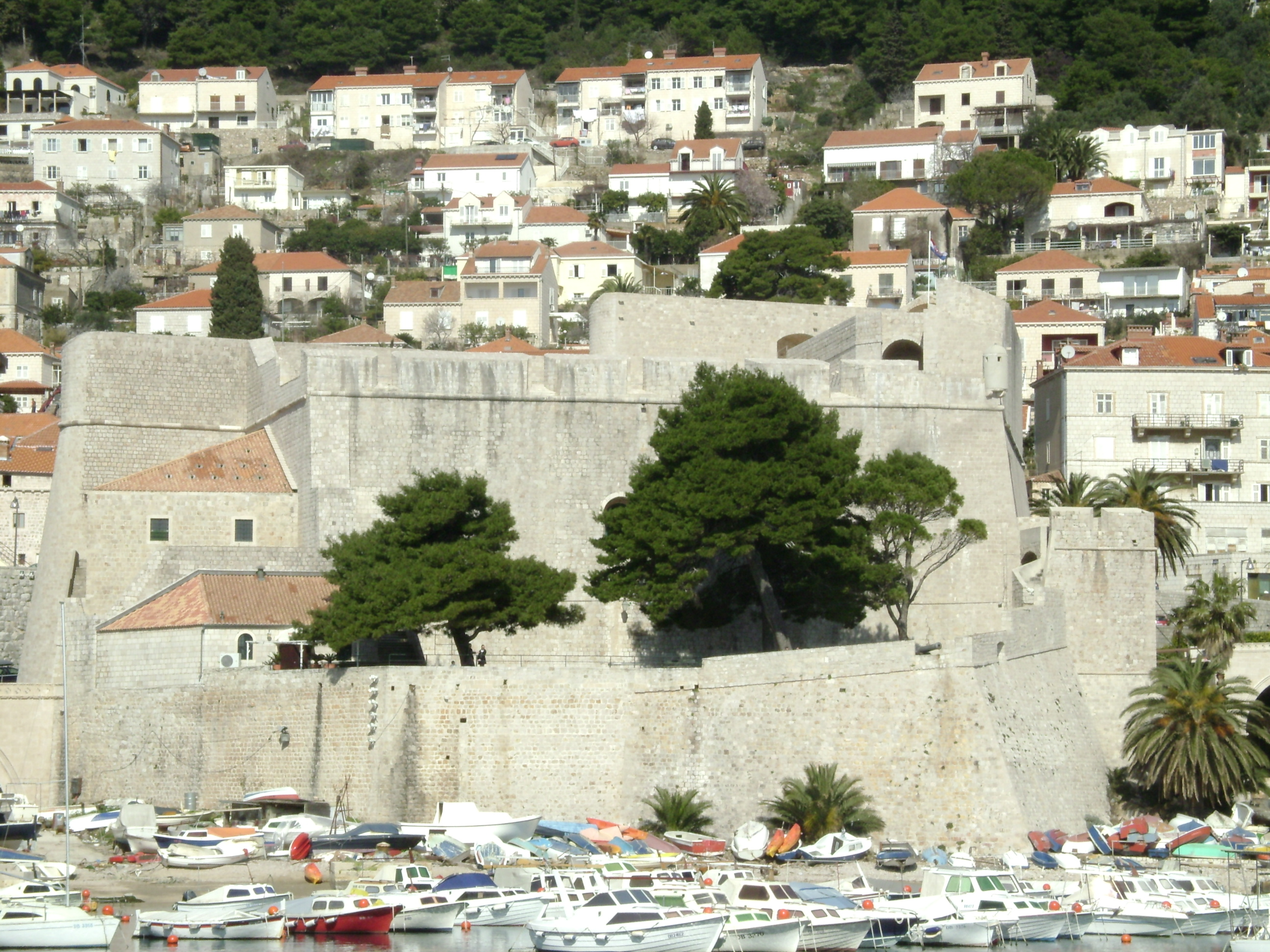
The 16th-century Revelin Fortress in Dubrovnik was one of the shooting locations.

The shooting started only in spring 2003, and almost immediately ran into delays and various other problems. Contrary to earlier agreement, the City of Dubrovnik refused to pay for extras' expenses. By May, the shooting was behind schedule due to director's illness and hospitalization, and there were reports - denied by Aleksandar Črček, the film's producer - that the cast and the crew were not being paid.

The financial difficulties ultimately stopped the filming, and the entire project was in serious jeopardy until the Government of Croatia intervened with a HRK 3.6 million financial guarantee that revived the production activities. The filming was finally completed on April 22, 2005, more than two years after the start, and was followed by post-production in Zagreb and Rome.

=== Filming locations ===
Many of the film's scenes were shot on-location. Locations in Dubrovnik include the Revelin Fortress, Stradun, the Sorkočević Villa, as well as the historical streets of the Old Town.

Some of the scenes taking place in Florence were also shot on-location, while some were actually filmed in the medieval Istrian village of Draguć. Scenes were also filmed in Venice and in Tuscany.

== Themes ==
The film's title Libertas (Latin for "liberty") is a reference to the motto of the Republic of Ragusa: Non bene pro toto libertas venditur auro ("Liberty is not well sold for all the gold"). Although the reviewers were nearly unanimous in recognizing the film's subtext as a condemnation of modern despotism, Variety's reviewer Robert Koehler felt it was referring to Eastern Europe's communist regimes, while Croatian critics saw it rather as an allegory of post-communist Croatia. According to Croatian columnist and film critic Jurica Pavičić, a "small republic obsessed with independence, but totalitarian on the inside" is easily recognized as the 1990s Croatia, which is a reading that Bulajić explicitly agreed with in a 2006 interview.

Croatian film scholar Bruno Kragić described Libertas as an overtly political film based on the polar opposition of ideas of freedom and tyranny, embodied in the characters of Marin Držić and Luka, the Ragusan state censor. In his view, Libertas therefore "essentially repeats simplified dichotomies seen in earlier Bulajić's films, [...] The Man to Destroy (1979) in particular, about a progressive visionary and retrograde feudal elites".

== Reception ==
Prior to the film's premiere at the 2006 Pula Film Festival, the expectations were very high. Libertas was well received by the festival audience, with an average score of 4.41/5, ranking 3rd out of 8 films, but the critics rated it second-to-last at 2.55. The film won two minor awards at the festival, Golden Arena for Best Costume Design and Golden Arena for Best Make-up.

The reviews were generally unfavorable. Variety described Libertas as an "old-fashioned European costume drama" which is "grandly produced and blandly staged". A Nacional review found faults with rigid directing and lack of character depth. The critics disliked the poor dubbing, the "unconvincing" and "forced" romance subplot, and mixing of the 16th-century Ragusan dialect with modern Croatian. Ultimately, Libertas fared poorly at the box office.

Libertas was Croatia's submission to the 79th Academy Awards for the Academy Award for Best Foreign Language Film, but was not accepted as a nominee.

The film was adapted into a five-episode (four-episode for the Italian market) TV series which was broadcast in 2008 by the Croatian Radiotelevision and RAI.

== See also ==
- Cinema of Croatia
- List of submissions to the 79th Academy Awards for Best Foreign Language Film
