= Dubrovnik Summer Festival =

Annual event in Dubrovnik, Croatia

Dubrovnik Summer Festival Dubrovačke ljetne igre

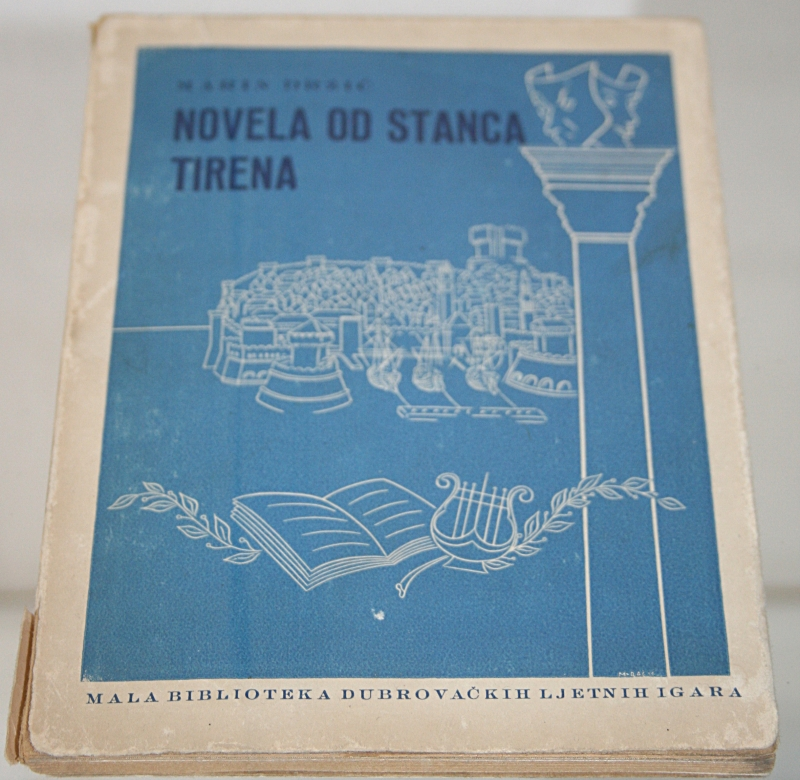
- Re-publication of Marin Držić's comedy (from 1550) 'Novela od Stanca' (DLjI 1008) by the Festival
- Location: Dubrovnik
- Started: 1950
- Website: www.dubrovnik-festival.hr/en

The Dubrovnik Summer Festival (Croatian: Dubrovačke ljetne igre; [dubrɔʋatʃkɛ ʎɛtnɛ iɡrɛ]) is an annually-held summer festival instituted in 1950 in Dubrovnik, Croatia. It is held every year between 10 July and 25 August.

On more than 70 open-air venues of Renaissance-Baroque city of Dubrovnik a rich programme of classical music, theatre, opera and dance performances is presented.

== History ==
The idea of founding the Dubrovnik Summer Festival' in 1950 was harmonizing the renaissance and baroque atmosphere of Dubrovnik and the living spirit of drama and music, actually derived from the intellectual way of life of the city itself, from its living creative tradition, which has bestowed upon Croatian cultural and scholarly history, especially in theatre and literature, many great names and works, and kept it continually in touch with contemporary currents in western Europe.

== Programme ==
=== Drama programme ===
The works of Marin Držić, Nikola Nalješković, Ivan Gundulić and Ivo Vojnović were to become a mainstay of the drama programme, then, while with the understanding of the idea of the importance of ambience, which is the principal distinguishing feature of the Dubrovnik Festival, the specific theatrical values of the wider Croatian dramatic heritage gradually became revealed, as did the adaptability of the classics of European dramatic art to the squares, palaces, towers and parks of Dubrovnik. Above all Shakespeare, but also the Greek tragedians, Goldoni, Calderon de la Barca, Molière, Corneille and Goethe became yardsticks of the traditionalist nature of the festival. As early as 1952 director Marko Fotez, the prime mover behind the group of enthusiasts who started up the Festival, put on Hamlet at the Fort Lovrijenac, which soon became an ideal setting for this drama known throughout the world. Equally attractive were the performances of Goldoni's Fishermens Quarrels in the old city harbour, renaissance comedies and mystery plays taking place in the city squares (called after Gundulić, Bunić and Držić), Goethes Iphigenia, staged in Gradac Park by Croatias greatest director Branko Gavella, and Vojnović's The Trilogy of Dubrovnik, an emblematic work about the fall of the Dubrovnik Republic, staged in the authentic rooms of the Rector's Palace, Sponza Palace and Gruž summer residence.

The ambience determined not only the repertoire but also the organization of the festival, and most of the performances are performed by the Festival Drama Ensemble, composed of the best Croatian actors. There were also guest appearances that enhanced exclusiveness of the event including the Piccolo Teatro from Milan, the Old Vic, the Greek National Theatre from Athens, the Stadttheater from Basel, the Prospect Theatre Company and the Royal National Theatre from London, New York La Mama, the Teatar Stary from Kraków and many others.

Hamlet has been played by prestigious actors such as Derek Jacobi, Daniel Day-Lewis and Goran Višnjić.

=== Music programme ===
The festival music programme was initially conceptualised as presentation of the best composers, soloists and orchestras from the country, but by the end of the fifties it had already grown into a real review of top solo artists and ensembles from all around the world. The high standard of performance in Dubrovnik was complemented by functional use of the attractive and acoustic buildings, particularly the Rector's Palace Atrium. In the early seventies special attention was paid to the music and concert programme conception, with larger number of representatives of new currents in music taking part, in addition to those who attempted to breathe new life into the old, especially Croatian, music.

Many famous artists and orchestras performed at the Dubrovnik Summer Festival, contributing to its prestige worldwide. In addition to regular appearances of the Zagreb Philharmonic Orchestra and the Dubrovnik Symphony Orchestra, on festival performed the Belgrade Philharmonic Orchestra, the Czech Philharmonic, The Hallé Orchestra, the French Radio Orchestra, the Suisse Romande Orchestra, the Israel Philharmonic Orchestra, the RAI Symphony Orchestra from Turin, philharmonic orchestras from London, Vienna, Dresden, Berlin, Moscow, Warsaw, St Petersburg, and the Cincinnati Symphony.

Among chamber and vocal ensembles the Beethoven Quartet, Borodin Quartet and Prokofiev Quartet from Moscow, the LaSalle Quartet and Juilliard Quartet from New York City, the Amadeus Quartet from London, the Parrenin Quartet from Paris, the New Vienna Quartet and Alban Berg Quartet from Vienna, the Virtuosi di Roma, the Zagreb Soloists, the Lucerne Festival Strings, the Academy of St Martin in the Fields, the Vienna Boys, the Beaux Arts Trio from New York, the Prague Chamber Orchestra and many others. Among piano soloists taking part were Svyatoslav Richter, Vladimir Ashkenazy, Nikita Magaloff, Van Cliburn, Martha Argerich, Rudolf Firkusny, Alexis Weissenberg, Aldo Ciccolini, Claudio Arrau, Mihail Pletnov and Ivo Pogorelić, flutist James Galway, violinists Henry Szeryng, Leonid Kogan, Isaac Stern, David Oistrakh, Viktor Tretiakov, Zlatko Baloković and Uto Ughi, as well as cellists Rostropovich, Navarra, Janigro and Tortellier. Great singers like Nicolai Gedda, Montserrat Caballé and Viktor Đerek have also performed at the festival, as well as star performers like Duke Ellington, Dizzy Gillespie and Ravi Shankar.

=== Opera programme ===
The history of operatic performances began in 1951, when the Sarajevo Opera made a guest appearance with five of its productions. The period up to 1963 was characteristic of guest appearances mainly of opera houses from the then state, but also of the search for venues suitable for staging of operas. In 1964, the first festival opera production, Monteverdi's The Coronation of Poppea, directed and conducted by Lovro Matačić, was put on in front of the Rector's Palace.

However, the best way of getting Dubrovnik and the opera together was found in 1971, and chamber operas, mostly comic, have been staged in the atrium of the Rector's Palace since. In addition to the festival performances of works by Monteverdi, Pergolesi, Caldara, Cimarosa, Salieri, Telemann or Galuppi, the practice of having guest opera performances continued, including those by the Opera of the Croatian National Theatre from Zagreb, the Teatro Massimo from Palermo, the Piccolo Teatro Musicale from Rome, the Phoenix Opera from London, and the Moscow Chamber Musical Theatre.

=== Ballet programme ===
Ballet and other forms of dance have been part of the Dubrovnik Summer Festival programme, with performances held on the terrace of the Revelin Fortress. Participating choreographers and dancers have included Merce Cunningham, Jerome Robbins, Alvin Ailey, Glen Tetley and Martha Graham together with their companies.Other visiting companies have included Maurice Béjart’s Ballet of the 20th Century, American Ballet Theatre, London Festival Ballet, Harkness Ballet, the Antonio Gades company, the Hungarian State Opera Ballet, and ballet companies from Parma, Antwerp and Adelaide.

=== Exhibitions ===
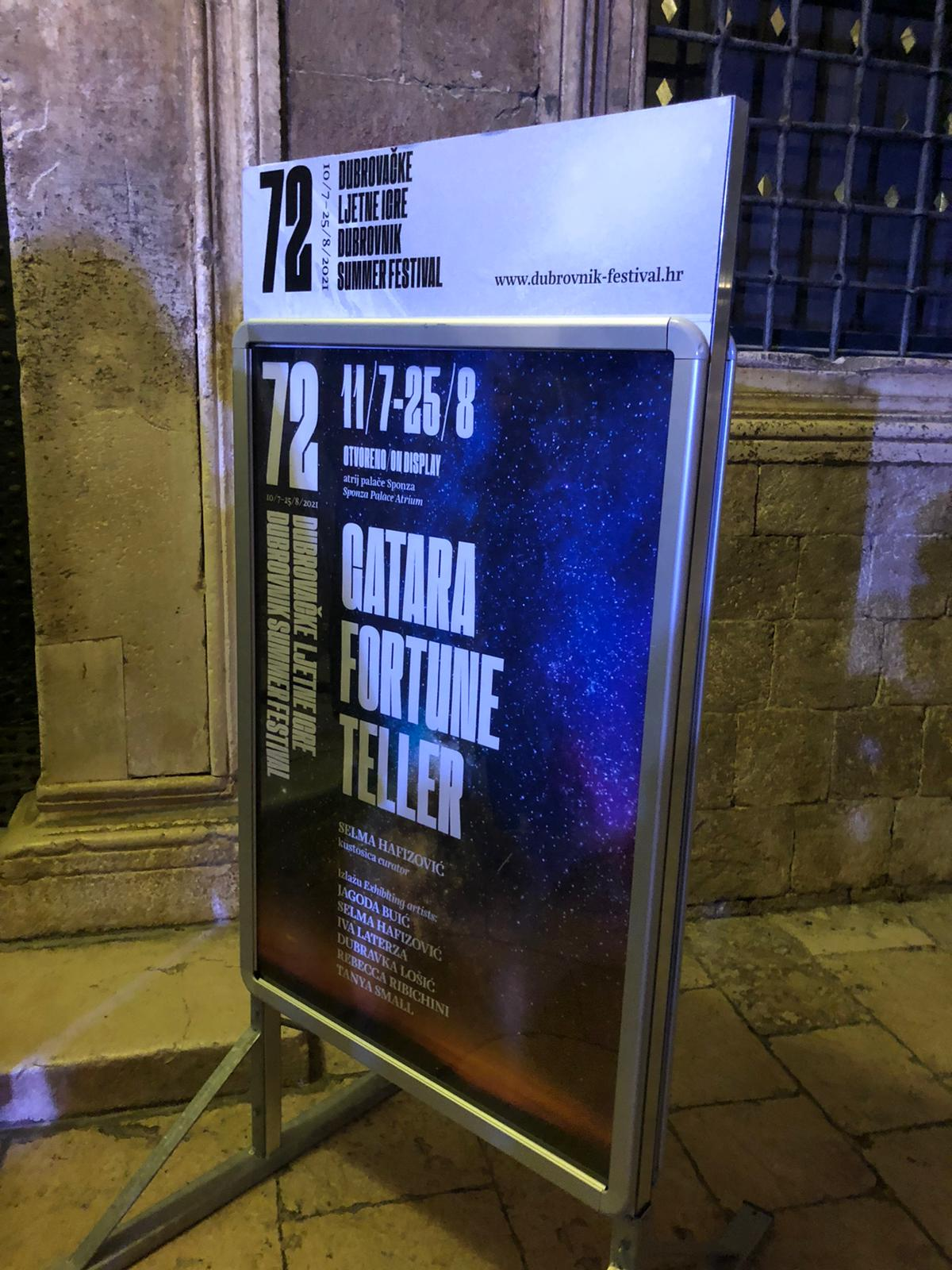
Dubrovnik Summer Festival 2021 exhibition poster

As a part of side program of festivals, visual art, design or documentary exhibitions have been a part of the festival, mostly presented in unique ambients of the city, rather than classical white cube galleries, like in 2018 when it presented contemporary artists from Dubrovnik in 'Horrors of the Homeland' across the several locations in the city.

2021 exhibition 'Fortune Teller' was presented in the primary location of Sponza Palace and was exceptionally focused on feminist art. Group exhibition 'Fortune Teller' was curated by American-Croatian artist Selma Hafizović, displaying large scale works of pioneer of feminist art Jagoda Buić, together with younger Iva Laterza, Dubravka Lošić, Rebecca Ribichini, Tanya Small and her own paintings.

== Sources ==
- "Dubrovačke ljetne igre". Croatian Encyclopedia (in Croatian).
