= Dubrovnik Symphony Orchestra =

Croatian orchestra

The Dubrovnik Symphony Orchestra (Croatian: Dubrovački simfonijski orkestar) is a professional musical orchestra from the city of Dubrovnik, Croatia and the chief musical representative of the Dubrovnik region. In its work it carries on with the musical history started in the earlier Republic of Dubrovnik (then Ragusa).

== History ==
Music in Dubrovnik advanced with the support of the most affluent nobility. The first musical groups were formed to perform concerts in celebration of the city's patron, Saint Blaise (locally Sveti Vlaho). For these performances only the most talented musicians were selected.

As the number of musicians in the Republic increased, the Senate decided to introduce qualified professors who could teach music to the youth. Apart from teaching, these professors played in the orchestra Knez's Music (Croatian: Kneževe glazbe). Musical influence during this time mostly came from the Italian city states, so the professors during this time were mostly from Italy. Young musicians extended their musical education most often in the cities of Naples and Rome.

In modern times, an orchestra was formed on August 25, 1925 under the name Dubrovnik Philharmonic Orchestra. The first symphony concert was held in the Marin Držić Theatre under the Polish conductor Tadeusz Sygietynski, then the conductor of the Warsaw Opera company. Reviews of the performance were good, and the activities of the orchestra were soon financed by the local government.

Over the years the orchestra changed its name several times. In 1946 it took on the name Dubrovnik City Orchestra. In 1992, it began to work closely with the Dubrovnik Summer Games and changed its name to the Dubrovnik Festival Orchestra. The current name was adopted in 1995.

Over the years many well-known conductors and performers have played with the orchestra: Lovro von Matačić, Zubin Mehta, Kirill Kondrashin, Ernst Märzendorfer, Henryk Szeryng, Mstislav Rostropovich, Antonio Janigro, Yehudi Menuhin, Anton Nanut, David Oistrakh, Sviatoslav Richter and others.

== Present ==
The orchestra regularly performs at the Dubrovnik Summer Festival. Its repertoire includes many of Dubrovnik's 18th century classics, especially those of Luka Sorkočević and Ivan Mane Jarnović. The orchestra also holds concerts in the atrium of the Rector's Palace, as well as performing around Croatia and internationally. Throughout the year, Dubrovnik Symphony Orchestra produces music festivals that attract audiences from all over the world:

- Dubrovnik Late Summer Festival - Orlando Furioso - Tino Pattiera - Autumn Music Variety - Stradun Classic - Dubrovnik Music Spring

Together with renowned musicians and conductors, Dubrovnik Symphony Orchestra participates in creation of quality cultural programme, presenting Dubrovnik as a cultural destination.
