= Savino Bobali =

Ragusan poet

Savino Bobali (Croatian: Sabo Bobaljević Mišetić, 1530–1585), nicknamed "the Deaf" (Sordo, Glušac), was a Ragusan nobleman, politician and founder of the literary "Academy of Concords". He wrote poetry in Italian and also in Croatian.

== Life ==
Born into the local nobility of Ragusa, he became at 20 a member of the Great Council of the Republic of Ragusa and set about fulfilling the duties that fell to him as an aristocrat. With Amalteo and Nascimbeni he founded a literary academy, the "Academy of Concords". The members met in the Palace of Customs, to read their rhymes. This palace was also the meeting place for other important individuals of Dubrovnik, as Lucijan Ghetaldi, Natal Tudisi, Marin Kosta (also member of the Accademia dei Confusi of Viterbo), Marin Držić, Dinko Ranjina, Nikola Primi, Luka Sorkočević, the poet Julija Bona, Mihajlo Monaldi.

Bobali contracted syphilis at a young age. Because of his condition he had to move to his castle in Ston near Dubrovnik, where he spent segregated the most part of his life. There he works on his poetry and studies. He complained in his poems of his physical condition, that it did not allow him to live according to his impetuous nature. He wished to travel. He was fascinated by Italy, but he was never able to go there.

Bobali is remembered also as a patient. His disease was studied by one of the most celebrated doctors of his time. When he was 30, his disease was described by the Portuguese doctor Amatus Lusitanus (João Rodriguez). The work was published in 1560. Here it is written of a patient sick of syphilis, who complains of vertigo and loss of hearing. He became totally deaf.

Bobali died in Ston in 1585, at the age of 55.

== Works ==
He was non-conformist, disobedient and rebellious; when, because of his health condition, he finally decided to move to the countryside, he began a journey into meditation and in his own soul. Therefore, giving vent to his ripped intimacy, he fulfilled the poetic space with very personal reflections and conflicting tensions, in a way not experienced yet. He was an undisciplined Petrarchist, he went beyond the classical conventions: he was the poet of the pain, of the contrasts, of the intense emotions, a careful explorer the opposites.

Bobali was the first true mannerist in south Slav poetry. Recycling common literary themes, he fulfilled with freshness and with force the musicality of the previous centuries. He subjugated them with the erupting expressiveness of a voice of sorrow and happiness.

He wrote mostly in Italian but also in Croatian. His verses were collected by his friends, and they were first published with the title "Rime amorose, pastorali e satiriche del magnifico Savino de Bobali Sordo, Gentiluomo Raguseo", by Aldine Press in Venice in 1589, four years after his death. The collection was reprinted in Ragusa in 1783.

== See also ==
- Renaissance literature
- Croatian literature
- Italian literature
