= Damjan Juda =

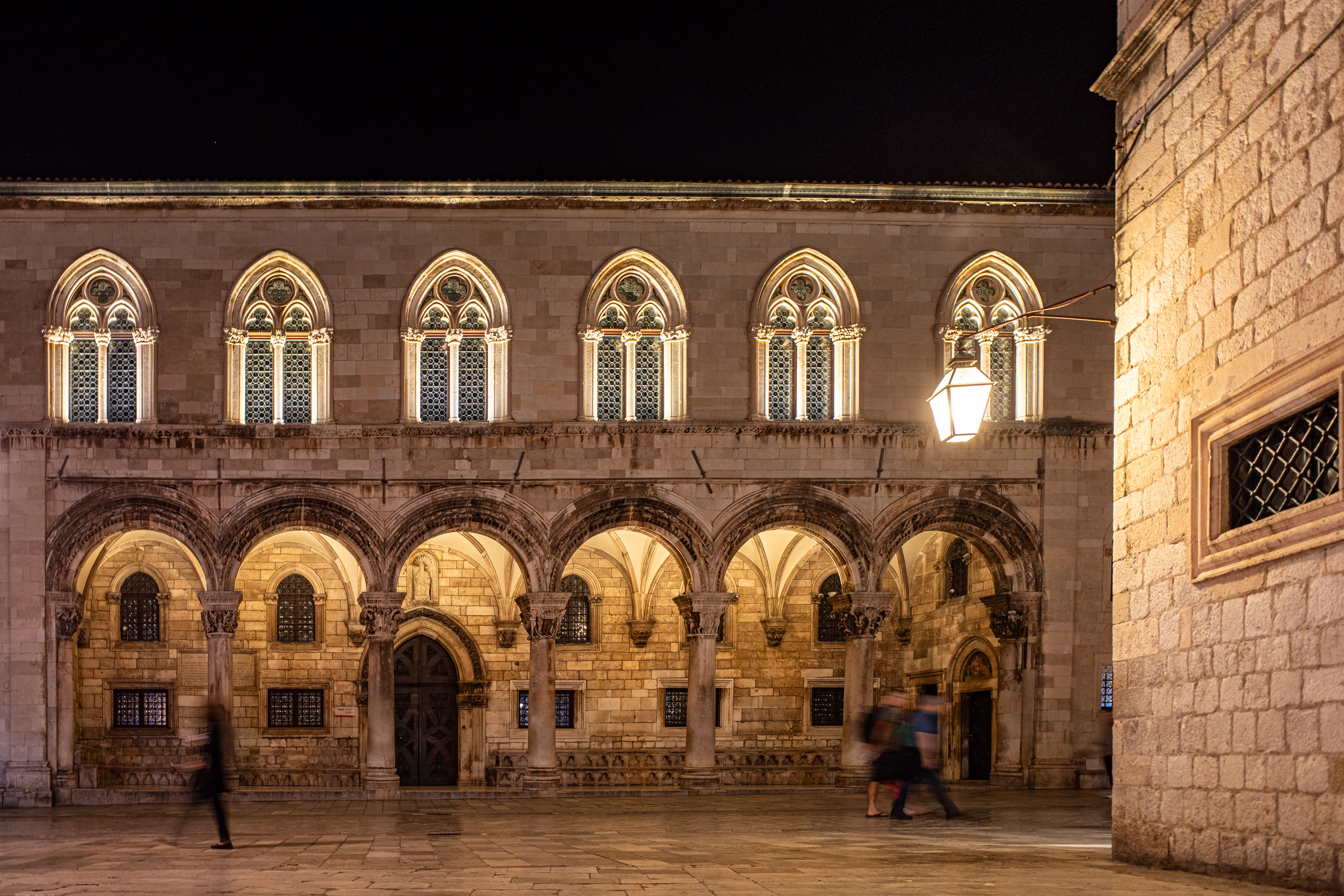
- Rector's Palace in Dubrovnik, where Damjan Juda resided
- Born: (?); Dubrovnik, Republic of Dubrovnik (Ragusa) (modern-day Croatia)
- Died: 1205; Dubrovnik
- Occupations: Rector, head of the Republic

Damjan Juda (12th century – 1205) was a patrician and politician from the city-state of Dubrovnik (later Republic of Ragusa). At the very beginning of the 13th century, he was rector of the city-state before being deposed in a tense political situation in a conspiracy and was forced to commit suicide.

== Biography ==
Damjan Juda was a member of a prominent and wealthy patrician family named Juda originating in Dubrovnik. Very little is known about his life. His descendants are mentioned in documents until 1336. He himself was elected rector (Croatian: knez) of Dubrovnik, the highest representative of the city government, whose term of office at that time lasted half a year.

During his reign, the Fourth Crusade took place, resulting in great instability in the Mediterranean region, threatening Dubrovnik's independence and existence. Juda therefore decided to keep power firmly in his hands even after six months and gained the support of the population and the military for another year. However, a large part of the Dubrovnik patriciate rejected this, claiming that the rector had abused his power and violated the rule of semi-annual rotation of power. To force Juda to resign from power, the opposition nobles secretly called on the Venetians for help.

The Venetian authorities heeded the call, but did not attempt to overthrow the rector by military force, devising a ruse instead. They announced to the rector that they were coming for a friendly visit to Dubrovnik. Upon their arrival to the city, they invited him to enjoy their hospitality on the Venetian galley. According to diplomatic protocol, the rector went to the galley and was there captured by the Venetians, who tied him to the ship's mast. When Juda realized the despair of his situation, he committed suicide, according to oral tradition, by hitting his head hard against the mast.

Juda's suicide opened the opportunity for opponents and conspirators, including his son-in-law Petar Beneša and members of the influential patrician family Bobaljević (Italian: Bobali), to appoint a new rector who would represent their interests. Under pressure from the Venetians, who were then a rising maritime power, an aristocrat from Venice named Lelovello (or Zelovello) was appointed rector.

Several Dubrovnik chroniclers reported on Damjan Juda, including Ivan Ravenjanin, Giovanni Conversini da Ravenna (1343–1408) in his work "Historia Ragusii" (about 1387), then Džono Rastić (1669 – 1735) in his chronicle "The Dubrovnik Chronicle of Džono Rastić, from the Founding of the City to the Year 1451", as well as Ivan Gundulić (1451 – 1483) in his work "Chronica Ragusina Junii Restii, ab origine urbis usque ad annum 1451, item Joannis Gundulae".

== Aftermath ==
Dubrovnik chroniclers often described Damjan Juda as a usurper, thus interpreting the Venetian rector's seizure of power. From that time on, the Venetians de facto ruled Dubrovnik. This rule lasted from 1205 to 1358. Juda's death also marked the beginning of a centuries-long schism among the Dubrovnik nobility. On one side there were members of the families led by the Bobaljevićs, who showed more sympathy for the Venetians, and on the other side were those who under no circumstances wanted Venetian rule in Dubrovnik, led by members of the Gundulić family. Unusually, one of Damjan Juda's sons-in-law, Petar Beneša, sided with the Bobaljevićs, while the other son-in-law supported the Gundulić family. The division of the Dubrovnik nobility, with occasional frictions and conflicts, lasted until the fall of the Republic of Ragusa in 1808.

== See also ==
- List of Ragusans
- Venetian Dalmatia
- Dubrovnik Charter
