= Ivan Bunić Vučić =

Croatian politician and poet

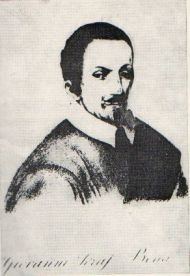
- Born: 1592; Ragusa
- Died: 6 March 1658 (aged 65–66); Ragusa
- Writing career
- Language: Croatian
- Genre: poetry
- Notable work: Plandovanja
- Literary movement: Baroque

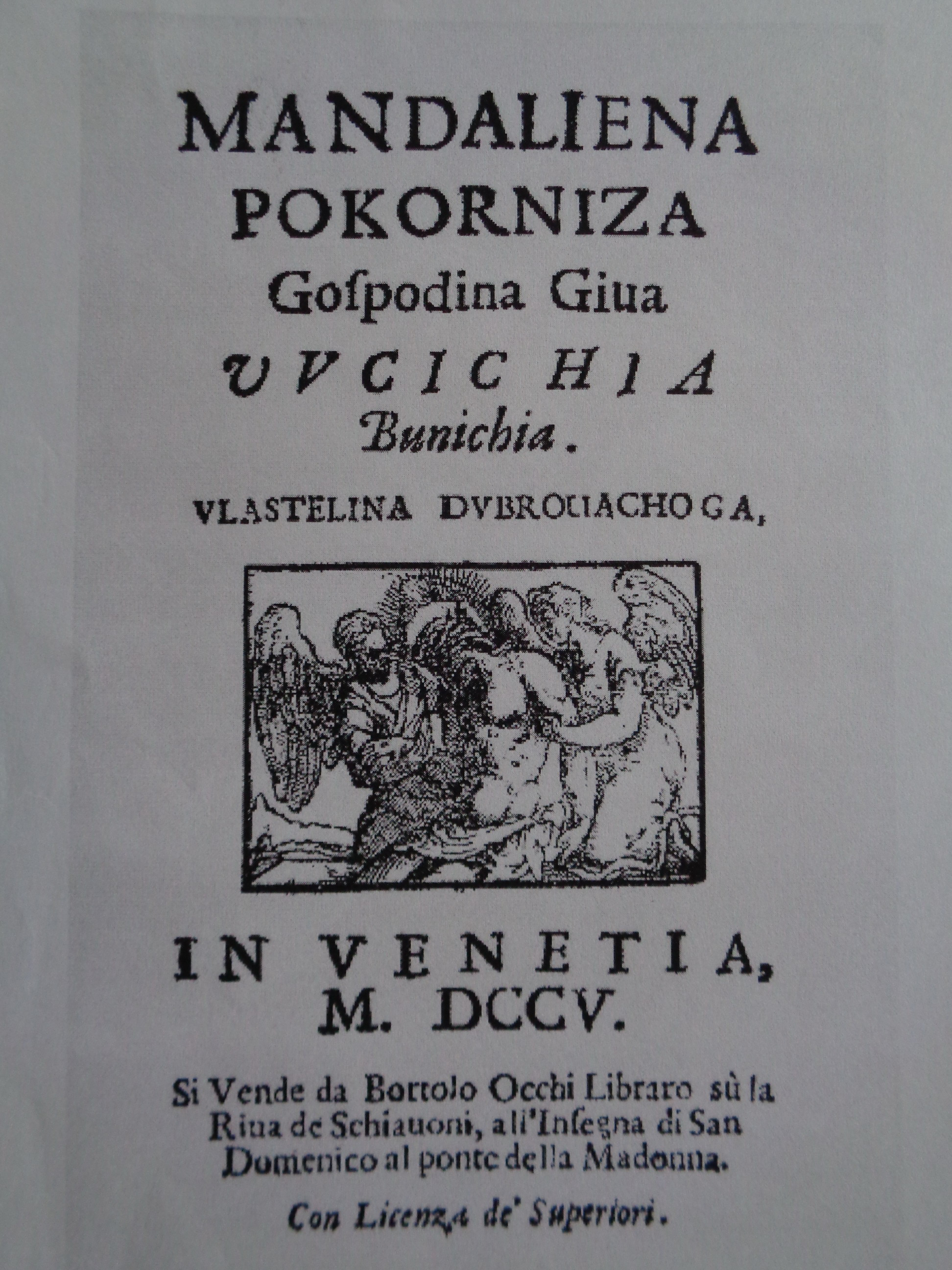
Title page of Mandalijena pokornica, 1705 edition

Dživo Vučić Bunić (or Dživo Sarov Bunić; Italian: Giovanni Serafino Bona; 1592 – 6 March 1658), now known predominantly as Ivan Bunić Vučić, was a Croatian baroque poet and politician from the Republic of Ragusa.

== Biography ==
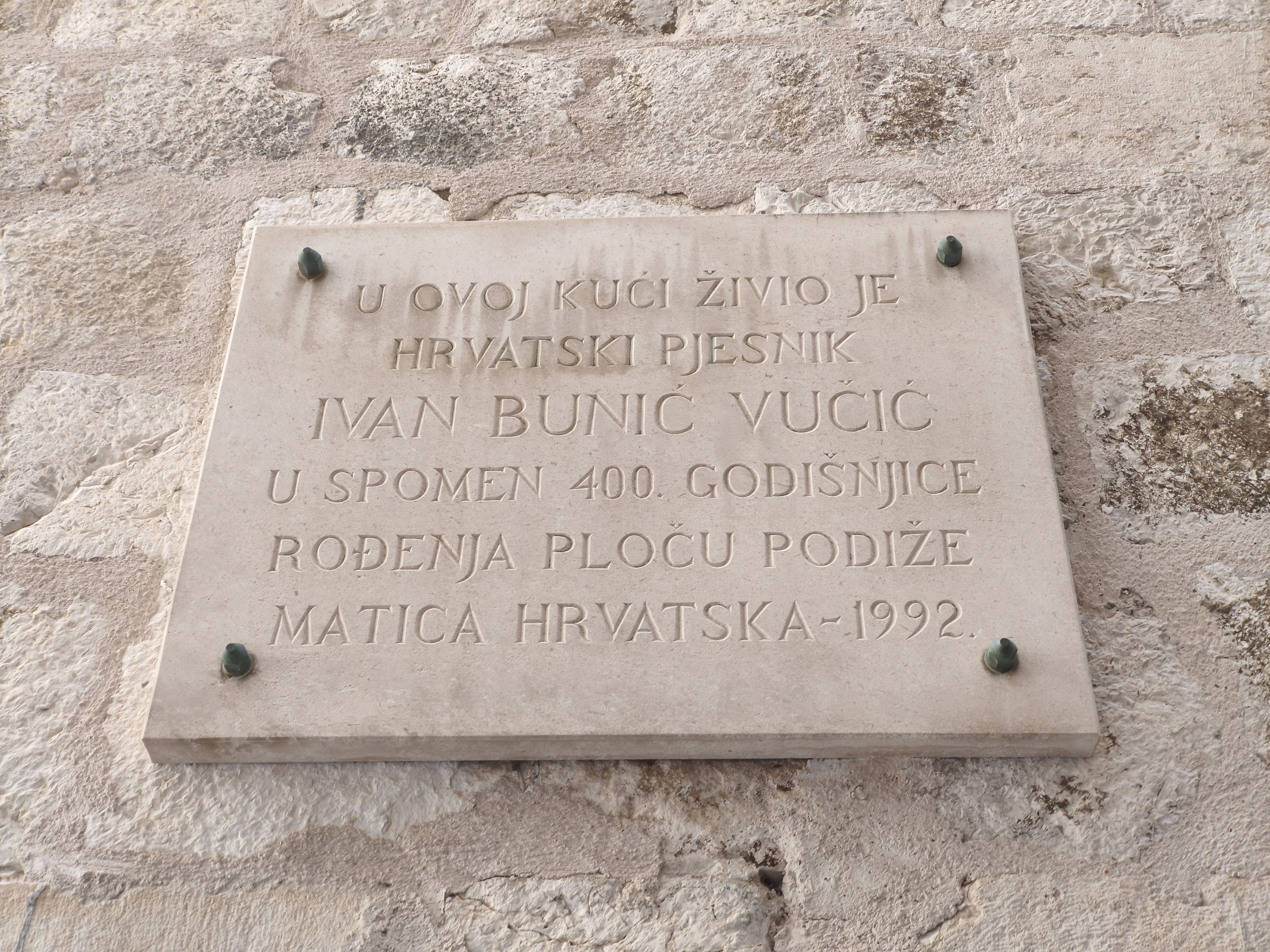
Plaque in Dubrovnik

He was born into a large family in Dubrovnik. He was a member of the Ragusean aristocracy (see House of Bunić), and was four times elected as Rector (Knez) of the Republic of Ragusa. He wrote poetry in Croatian. His most important work is Plandovanja, a collection of 110 poems which included new motives in Croatian literature. Only his religious narrative poem Mandaljena pokornica (Magdalene the Penitent) was printed during his lifetime (1630). A critical edition of Bunić's complete works edited by Milan Ratković was published in 1971.

Bunić Vučić died in Dubrovnik in 1658.
