= Bona family =

Noble family

(de) Bona Bunić
- Country: Republic of Venice; Republic of Ragusa (modern-day Croatia); Austria-Hungary
- Titles: Marquess
- Cadet branches: House of Giorgi-Bona

The House of Bona, or Bunić, is an ancient noble family long established in the city of Dubrovnik.

== History ==
The origins of the family remain largely unclear, but according to the two oldest traditions, it originated from Kotor in Venetian Albania, or else from the town of Vieste in Apulia and Leck. The Almanach de Gotha enumerates it among the eleven oldest native families of the Republic of Ragusa, and members of the family were still living in the city in the 19th century. The family was influential and wealthy in the Republic, divided into several branches, and combined with other noble families from Dubrovnik by a series of marriages, which in turn gave rise to additional branches of the family. Their nobility was recognised by the Austrian Empire, which granted a member of the family the title of marquess.

Coat of arms of the branch of Bona-Giorgi/Bunić-Đurđević

The main branch of the family is still in existence, with its principal residence in the United States, but also a secondary residence and several businesses in Dubrovnik.

== Notable members ==
- Jan (Giovanni) Junta Bona (15th century), merchant from Venice, owner of Krakow saltworks and several villages in Małopolska.
- Serafin (Saro) Bona (15th century), theologian and writer, the personal adviser of King Matthias Corvinus
- Župan Bona (died 1464), builder and politician
- Jakov Bunić (1469-1534), Croatian writer and poet, ambassador of the Republic to Pope Leo X. A syllogism of his works was published in Rome in 1526.
- Mihael (Miho) Bona (16th century), Latin, and Italian poet
- Ivan Bunić Vučić (1591 or 1592–1658), poet and writer, now recognized as one of the founders of Croatian literature.
- Nikola Bona (1635-1678), led the Republic after the disastrous earthquake of 1667, considered "father" of his country. Died a prisoner of the Ottoman rule in Bosnia, a state funeral was decreed in his honour, and a plaque was erected in the hall of the Grand Council of the Republic. Wrote in the Illyrian Herodias, and other compositions in Italian and Latin.
- Đivo Bona (18th century), student of Cardinal Giovanni Battista Tolomei. He was a poet and writer, remembered for translating plays from French into Croatian, as well as several poems of his own.
- Jero Frano Bona (18th century), bishop and writer
- Frano Bona (1669-1717), general, killed in Belgrade
- Luka Bona (1708-1778), lawyer and writer
- Eduard Bona-Bunić (1894–1944), Croatian Home Guard general
- Frano de Bona (1909–1991), recruited as a spy for the Abwehr during the Second World War but turned by the British Secret Intelligence Service (as Agent FREAK) as part of the Double-Cross System.

== Gallery ==
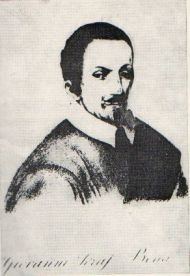
Ivan Bunić Vučić

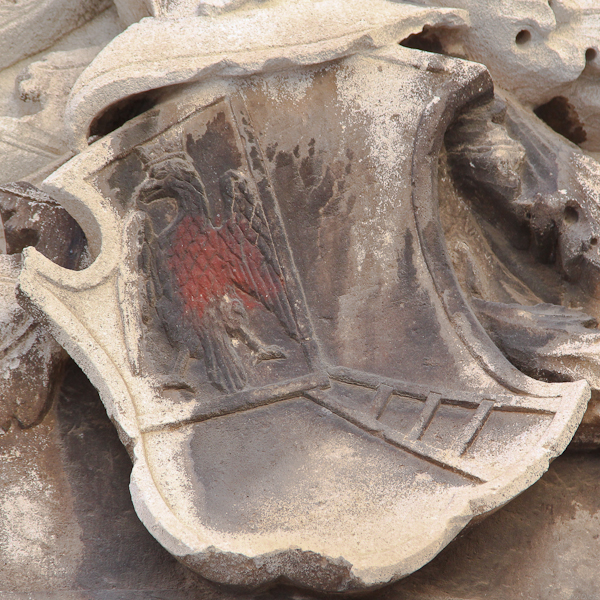
Coat of arms on the de Bona villa in Dubrovnik

== See also ==
- Dalmatia
- Dubrovnik
- Post-Roman patriciates
- Republic of Ragusa

== Sources ==
- Francesco Maria Appendini, Notizie istorico-critiche sulle antichità storia e letteratura de' Ragusei, Dalle stampe di Antonio Martecchini, Ragusa 1803
- Renzo de' Vidovich, Albo d'Oro delle famiglie nobili patrizie e illustri nel Regno di Dalmazia, Fondazione Scientifico Culturale Rustia Traine, Trieste 2004
- Simeone Gliubich, Dizionario biografico degli uomini illustri della Dalmazia, Vienna-Zara 1836
- Giorgio Gozzi, La libera e sovrana Repubblica di Ragusa 634–1814, Volpe Editore, Roma 1981
- Robin Harris, Dubrovnik, A History, ISBN 978-0-86356-959-3
- Konstantin Jireček, L’eredità di Roma nelle città della Dalmazia durante il medioevo, 3 voll., AMSD, Roma 1984–1986
