= Jakov Bunić =

Renaissance humanist, poet (1469–1534)

- Born: 23 February 1469; Dubrovnik, Republic of Dubrovnik/Republic of Ragusa (modern-day Croatia)
- Died: 18 May 1534 (aged 65); Dubrovnik
- Other names: Giacomo Bona, Iacobus Bonus
- Occupations: poet, diplomat, state official, lawyer and merchant
- Known for: poetry
- Notable work: De vita et gestis Christi; De raptu Cerberi; Carmina minora; Epistulae

Jakov Bunić (also known as Giacomo Bona in Italian or Iacobus Bonus in Latin; 23 February 1469 – 18 May 1534) was a Croatian renaissance poet, latinist, diplomat, state official, lawyer and merchant from the Republic of Dubrovnik (Republic of Ragusa). He was a member of the Bunić noble family, one of the oldest families in the Republic.

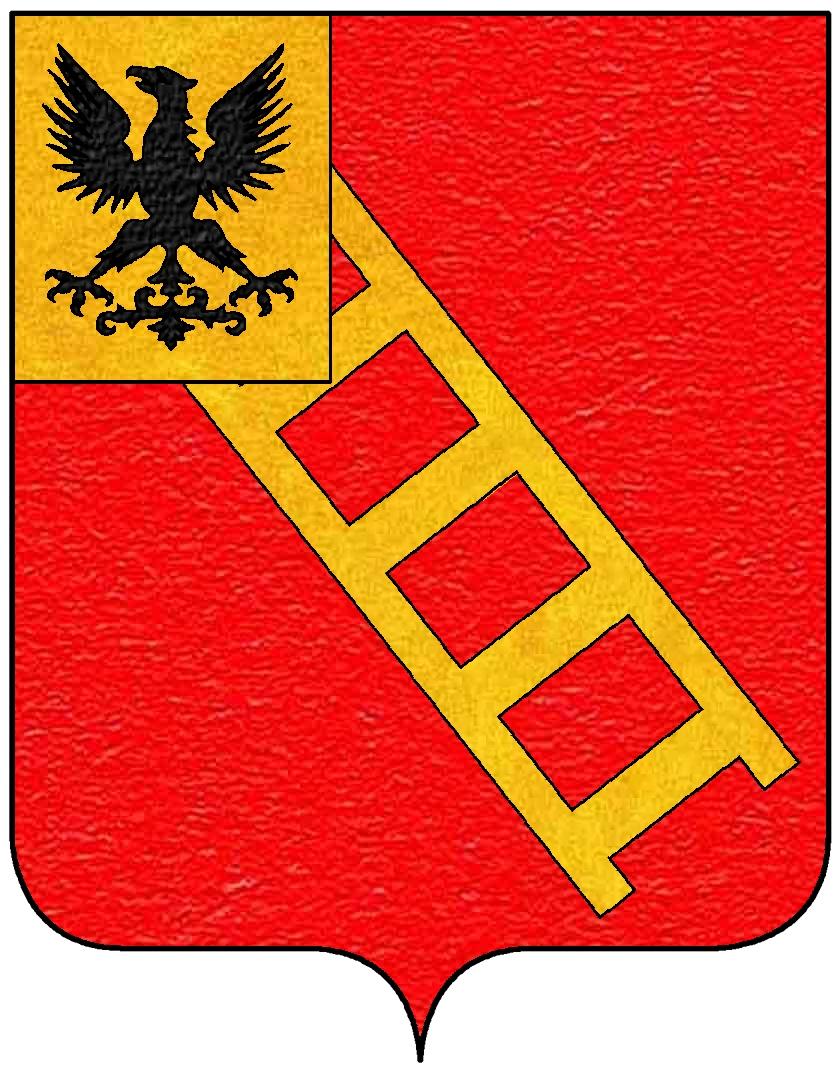
Coat of arms of the Bunić family

== Biography ==
Bunić was born in 1469 in Dubrovnik. His father Ilija (Elijah) Bunić served as ambassador of the Republic of Dubrovnik to the Vatican and to Ferdinand I, King of Naples. There are very few reliable sources of information about his youth years. His boyhood days he spent mostly in Dubrovnik, where he acquired his first education, and then continued his studies in Padua (Padova) and Bologna in Italy.

A significant part of his lifetime Bunić spent trading in Europe and the Near East, mostly in Egypt, dealing with carpets and jewels. In 1496 he married Marija Crijević with whom he had two sons, Franjo and Nikola, as wall as a daughter, Većica.

As a young poet (around 1490) Bunić wrote an epic poem called "The kidnapping of Cerberus" (Latin: De raptu Cerberi). It is the oldest epic poem in Croatian literature. Later he wrote several dozens of shorter poems and other works, as well as the large epic "The Life and Works of Christ" (De vita et gestis Christi). In the latter one, he covered the entire life of Jesus Christ in verse, using 10,049 hexameters and 16 cantos. All of his late works were published in 1526. With his works he influenced other latinists from Dubrovnik, for example Damjan Benešić /or Beneša/ ("Death of Christ") and Junije Palmotić "Christiade - Life and Work of Jesus Christ").

During his lifetime, Bunić, as a distinguished citizen, held many public offices. Five times he was the Rector of the Republic (1521, 1523, 1526, 1530 and 1532), five times he was appointed to represent his country abroad. He worked as a municipality lawyer, state appraiser of the value of goods, then served as the Rector of Ston and Šipan, member of the Minor Council etc.

At least two times he was in Rome. The first time he went to Rome in 1513 as the head of the Dubrovnik delegation to the newly elected Pope Leo X. The second time he visited Rome in the autumn of 1525 to ask Pope Pope Clement VII for a recommendation for the publication of his epic "The Life and Works of Christ". Having achieved that, he remained in Rome, supervising the printing of the book until its completion in May 1526.

Jakov Bunić died on 18 May 1534 in Dubrovnik and was buried in the Dubrovnik cemetery. His death was mourned in a biographical poem (containing 263 hexameters) by Damjan Benešić.

== List of works ==
- De raptu Cerberi ("The kidnapping of Cerberus")
- De vita et gestis Christi ("The Life and Works of Christ")
- Carmina minora ("Minor Songs")
- Epistulae ("Letters")

== See also ==
- List of Ragusans
- History of Dalmatia
- Renaissance literature
