= Bobali =

Noble family of the Republic of Ragusa

Bobali (de) Bobali, Babalio
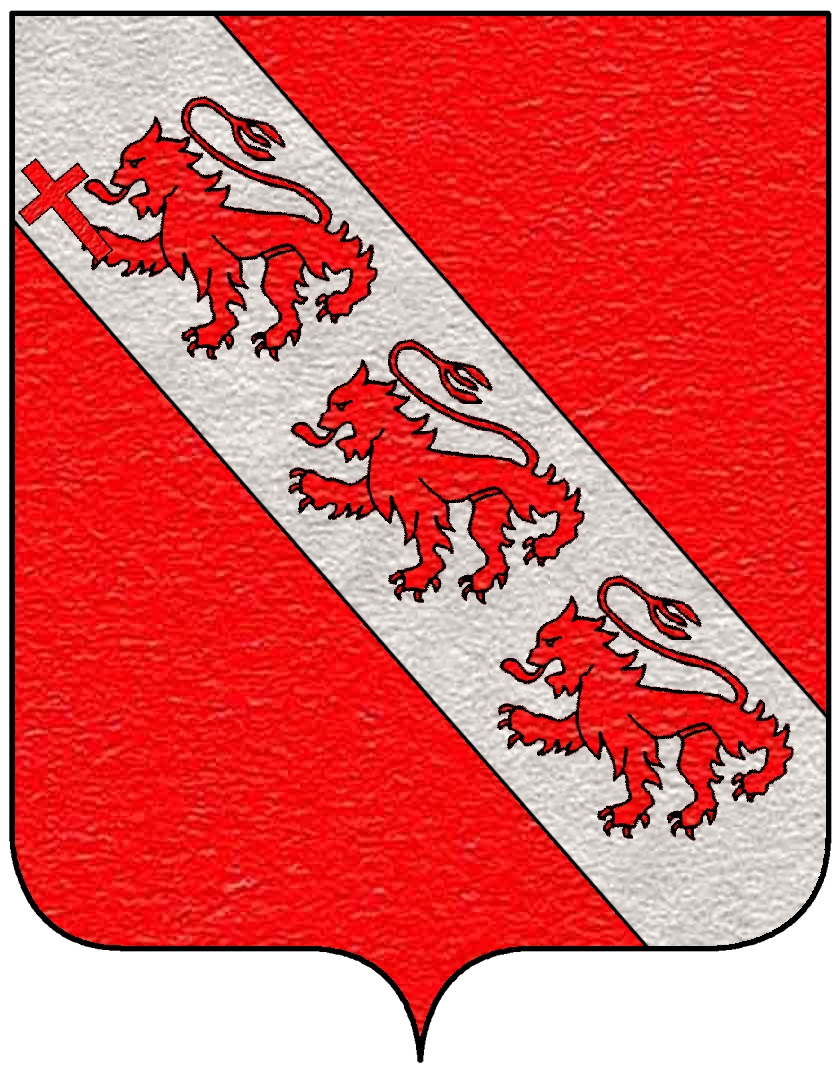
- Country: Republic of Ragusa
- Dissolution: 1771

The House of Bobali or Babalio (in Italian; known as Bobaljević or Bobalić in Croatian) was a noble family of the Republic of Ragusa.

== History ==
The family is considered to be one of those which founded the ancient community of Dubrovnik. The surname is attested in various forms in different places: Baebiblius nearby Salona, Babuleius, Babullia, Bobuli or Boboli in Italy. One of the etymologies proposed considers that all these surnames are derived from the early-medieval name Babilius or Babilonius. According to another ancient tradition the Bobali originated in Bosnia in the 10th century.

The Bobali gave the Republic a large number of politicians, scholars and writers. In the 14th century they had 124 senior civil servants in senate (representing 3.32%). Similarly, between 1440 and 1640 there were 64 Bobali in the Grand Council (2.91% of total). In two hundred years, they had 59 senatorial positions (1.81%), 66 members of the Minor Council (3.05%), 23 Guardians of Justice (2.80%) and for 59 times a member of Bobali that became Rettore of the Republic (2.48%).

The Bobali family became extinct in 1771 with the death of Frano Damjanov Bobali.

== Notable people ==
- Domanja Bobaljević (14th century) – priest and politician, served Bosnian Ban Stephen II. He fought the Bosnian Church and defended Bosnia from aspirations of Serbian Emperor Stefan Dušan.
- Francesco Cuco de Bobali (16th century) – poet and writer, left many songs, collected by abbot Giorgi in a volume entitled Poesie de Cuco il seniore.
- Savino Bobali (1530–1585) – poet and writer among the most important of his time (Rime amorose, pastorali e satiriche del magnifico Savino de Bobali Sordo).
- Marino de Bobali (17th century) – was a writer and philosopher. His work was printed in 1654 in Aquileia (Friuli). The best-known work was titled Del senso predominato dalla ragione ("About senses ruled by reason").

== Sources ==
- Francesco Maria Appendini, Notizie istorico-critiche sulle antichità storia e letteratura de' Ragusei, Dalle stampe di Antonio Martecchini, Ragusa 1803
- Renzo de' Vidovich, Albo d'Oro delle famiglie nobili patrizie e illustri nel Regno di Dalmazia, Cultural Scientific Foundation Rustia Traine, Trieste 2004
- Simeon Gliubich, Biographical dictionary of illustrious Dalmatian men, wien-Zadar 1836
- Giorgio Gozzi, The free and sovereign Republic of Ragusa 634–1814, Volpe Editore, Rome 1981
- Robin Harris, Storia e vita di Ragusa – Dubrovnik, la piccola Repubblica adriatica, Santi Quaranta, Treviso 2008
- Konstantin Jireček, The Legacy of Rome in the cities of Dalmatia in the Middle Ages, 3 vols., AMSD, Rome 1984–1986
- Dubrovacka vlastela izmedu roda i drzave, Stjepan Cosic, Nenad Vekaric, HAZU 2003
