= Sorkočević =

Sorkočević may refer to:

- House of Sorkočević (Italian: Sorgo), a noble family originating from the city of Dubrovnik
  - Franatica Sorkočević (1706–1771), a Croatian writer from Ragusa
  - Luka Sorkočević (Italian: Luca Sorgo; 1734–1789), a Croatian composer from the Republic of Ragusa (Dubrovnik)
  - Antun Sorkočević (Italian: Antonio Sorgo; 1775–1841), a diplomat, writer, composer
  - Elena Pucić-Sorkočević (Italian: Elena Pozza-Sorgo; 1786–1865), the first female composer in the Republic of Ragusa
