= Dinko Ranjina =

Croatian poet (1536–1607)

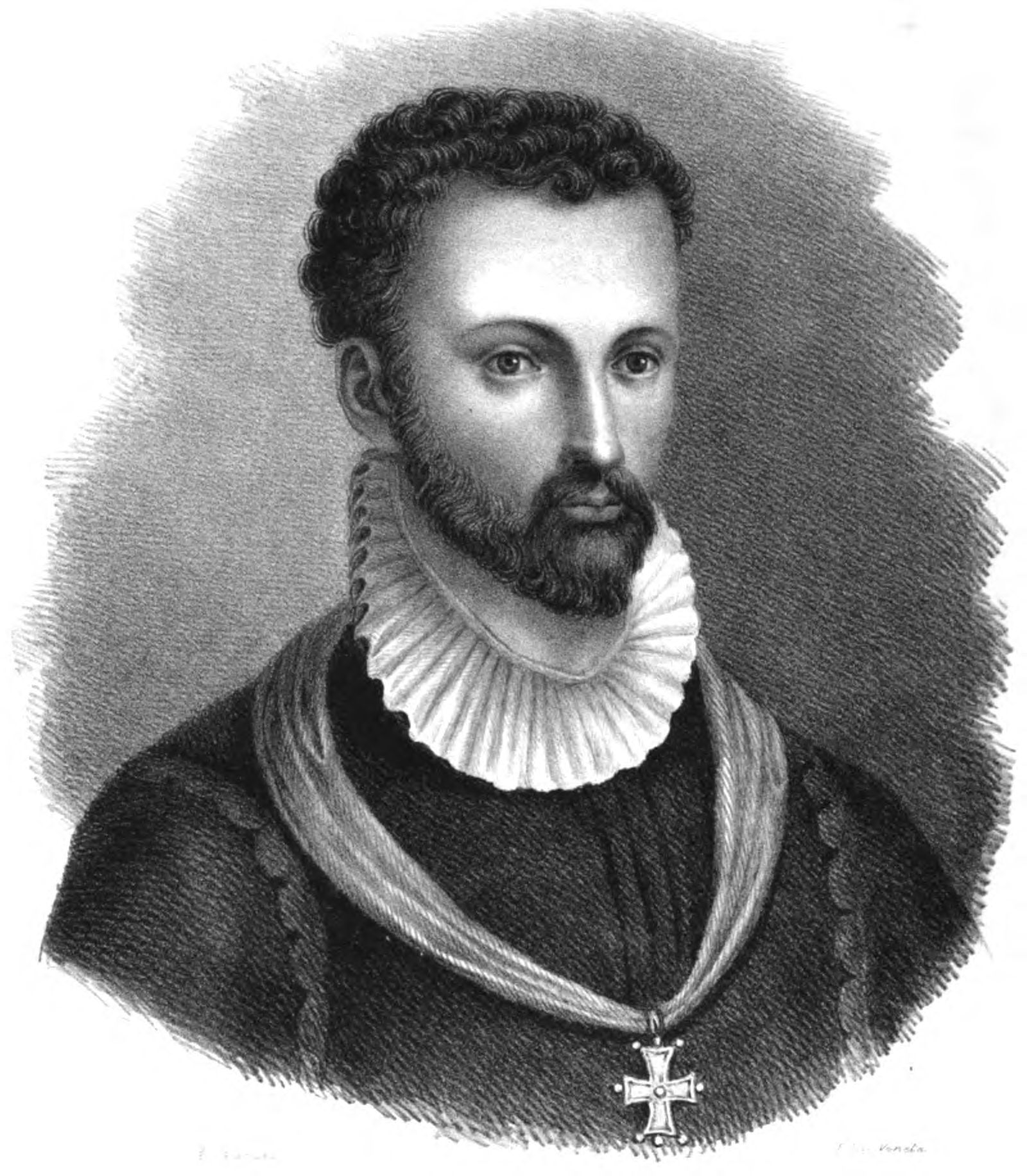
Dinko Ranjina (Domenico Ragnina).

Dinko Ranjina (also Domenico Ragnina; 1536–1607) was a Dalmatian poet from the Republic of Ragusa (Dubrovnik). In 1556 he was accepted into the Republic's ruling Grand Council. He was married to the sister of Francesco Luccari Burina.

== Life ==
Ranjina was born and died in Dubrovnik. He travelled to Messina in the hopes of taking up trade and eventually made his way to Florence. It was in Florence that he began to write.

He wrote extensively in both Croatian (about 450 poems) and Italian (about 30 sonnets) in the collection Rime scelte da diversi eccelenti autori from 1563. He also wrote the Croatian songbook Pjesni razlike.

Cosimo de' Medici admitted Ragnina to the Order of St. Stephen. A few years later he returned to the Republic of Ragusa.

He died in 1607, 71 years old and well esteemed, after having been rector (knez) of the Ragusa government seven times.

== See also ==
- Republic of Ragusa
- Croatian literature
- Dalmatian Italians
- Ranjina (family)
