= Franatica Sorkočević =

Croatian translator (1706–1771)

Ivan Franatica Sorkočević (Italian: Gianfrancesco Sorgo; 1706–1771) was a writer from Dubrovnik, at the time in the Republic of Ragusa.

== Sources ==
- Kravar, Zoran (1995). "O dvjema Tassovim oktavama u prepjevu Franatice Sorkočevića i o dodirnim stihovnopovijesnim temama". Dubrovnik Annals (in Croatian) (33). Croatian Academy of Sciences and Arts: 67–92. ISSN 1331-3878.
- Kravar, Zoran (1999). "On Franatica Sorkočević's translation of two octaves of Tasso, and related topics". Dubrovnik Annals (3). Croatian Academy of Sciences and Arts: 55–95. ISSN 1848-8153.
- "Sorkočević, Ivan Franatica". Croatian Encyclopedia (in Croatian). Miroslav Krleža Lexicographical Institute.
- Beritić, Nada (1965). "Franatica Sorkočević, dubrovački pjesnik XVIII stoljeća (1706-1771)". Rad - Philology Section (in Croatian) (338 / Book 13). Yugoslav Academy of Sciences and Arts: 147–258.
