= Renzo de' Vidovich =

Dalmatian Italian politician (1934–2024)

Lorenzo de' Vidovich
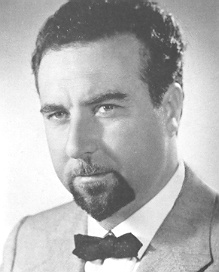

Member of the Chamber of Deputies
- In office 25 May 1972 – 4 July 1976
- Constituency: Trieste

Personal details
- Born: 27 February 1934 Zara, Italy
- Died: 28 August 2024 (aged 90) Trieste, Italy
- Party: Italian Social Movement
- Education: University of Trieste
- Profession: Journalist

Renzo de' Vidovich (27 February 1934 – 28 August 2024) was a Dalmatian Italian politician, historian and journalist.

== Biography ==
Born and growing up in Zadar (then official Zara), from the old noble Dalmatian family of de' Vidovich, Counts Capocesto e Ragosniza; he was a close cousin of Ottavio Missoni. He left Zadar for the exile at the beginning of the massive bombing of the city made by Allies in 1943. He moved to Trieste where he was general secretary of the board of students movement which assumed the responsibility of convening the riots of 5 and 6 November 1953 in support of the return of Trieste to Italy, that time occupied by the Anglo-American Allied Military Government.

Six Italians died during the fighting and there were a total of 153 wounded. The following year there was the reunification of Trieste to Italy. According with a de' Vidovic proposal, supported by the Lega nazionale di Trieste, the Government Berlusconi II awarded the National civil gold medal to the dead fighters specifying that they were decisive in the return of Trieste to its motherland.

While he was a student at the University of Trieste, de' Vidovich was editor of the newspaper La zona franca ("The Free Zone") which decisively resulted in the creation of the national economic free zone of Trieste. In 1968 he became secretary of the national labor union Cisnal, today Unione Generale Lavoro (UGL), in Trieste.

He founded and directed La Città, an informational magazine. Member of the municipal council of Trieste for more than ten years, he was also elected as city councilor in the town of Duino-Aurisina where he fought for the touristic development of Sistiana.

In 1972 de' Vidovich was elected to the Italian Chamber of Deputies for the Trieste electoral district, and was appointed secretary of the parliamentary group of the post-fascist Italian Social Movement.

He was also mayor of the Free Comune of Zara in Exile.

In 1999 he was appointed president of the Federation of Exiles from Istria, Fiume and Dalmatia. As president of the Rustia-Traine Foundation he participated actively in the creation of the Italian communities in Dalmatia: Zadar, Split, Hvar and Kotor. He also promoted courses of Italian language and culture in Dalmatia, and, in 2004, he founded the Centro di Ricerche Culturali Dalmate (Dalmatian Cultural Research Centre) in Split of which de' Vidovich was still chairman. The center promotes the publication – in collaboration with the Veneto Region – of numerous books on the cultural heritage of Dalmatia and Venice.

De' Vidovich died in August 2024, at the age of 90.

== Books and newspapers ==
In the 1970s de' Vidovich collaborated with Il Borghese, Candido (humor weekly magazine) and Il Secolo d'Italia. In 1996 he re-founded Il Dalmata, published since 1865 and abolished by Austria-Hungary in 1916; he later published, in 1992, Dalmatia region of Europe, followed by I Dalmati per Trieste and L'albo d'oro di nobili patrizi e nomi illustri nel Regno di Dalmazia ("Hall of honour of noble patricians and illustrious names in the Kingdom of Dalmatia"). He wrote numerous articles on Dalmatian press.
