= Marin Držić =

Croatian writer

- Born: 1508; Republic of Ragusa (modern Croatia)
- Died: May 2, 1567 (aged 58–59); Republic of Venice
- Occupation: Writer
- Writing career
- Period: Renaissance

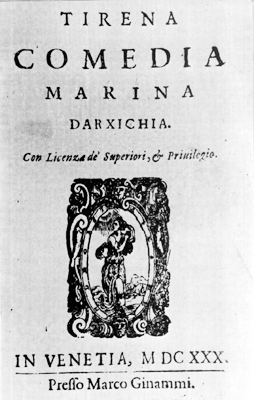
Cover of the third edition of Marin Držić's Pjesni, titled Tirena comedia Marina Darxichia, in Venice 1630, containing Držić's Petrarchist poetry and versified plays.

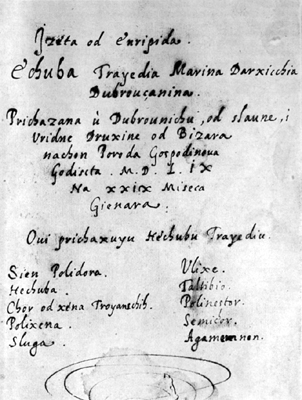
Cover page of the Šibenik copy of Marin Držić's Hekuba with the data on company of "Od Bidzara" and the date of performance (29 January 1559).

Marin Držić (Croatian pronunciation: [mâriːn dř̩ːʒitɕ]; also Marino Darza or Marino Darsa; 1508 – 2 May 1567) was a Croatian writer from Republic of Ragusa. He is considered to be one of the finest Renaissance playwrights and prose writers of Croatian literature.

== Life ==
Držić was born into a large and affluent family. He had six sisters and five brothers.

He was trained and ordained as a priest in Dubrovnik. Marin's uncle was another famous author Džore Držić. After being ordained in 1526, Držić was sent in 1538 to Siena in Tuscany to study the Church Canon Law, where his academic results were average. Thanks to his extroverted and warm personality, he is said to have captured the hearts of his fellow students and professors, and was elected to the position of rector of the university. Losing interest in his studies, Marin returned to the Dubrovnik Republic in 1543.

There, he became an acquaintance of Austrian adventurer Christoph Rogendorf, who was at odds with the court of Vienna. After a brief sojourn in Vienna, Držić came back to his native city. He pursuited various exploits, including forming relationships with a group of Dubrovnik outlaws, journeying to Constantinople and visiting Venice. After a career as an interpreter, scrivener and church musician, he even became a conspirator. Convinced that Dubrovnik was governed by a small circle of elitist aristocracy bent to tyranny, he tried to persuade in five letters (four of which survive) the powerful Medici family in Florence to help him overthrow the government in his home town; they did not respond.

He died suddenly in Venice on 2 May 1567. He was buried in the Church of St. John and Paul.

== Works ==
Držić's works cover many fields: lyric poetry, pastorals, political letters and pamphlets, and comedies. While his pastorals (Tirena, Venera i Adon and Plakir) are still highly regarded as masterful examples of the genre, the pastoral has, as artistic form, virtually vanished from the scene.

His comedies are among the best in European Renaissance literature. As with other great comedy writers like Lope de Vega, Ben Jonson or Molière, Držić's comedies are full of exuberant life and vitality, celebrating love, liberty and sincerity and mocking avarice, egoism and petty tyrants; both in the family and in the state. His best-known comedies include:

- Pomet (1548 or 1553) - some historiographers argue that Pomet is indeed Marin's oldest play, his debut, while others disagree. The fact that it is lost makes it harder to classify it.
- Novela od Stanca (1550)
- Dundo Maroje (1551 or 1556) - arguably Marin's most famous play. It was also played in some international theatres.
- Skup (1554) - thematically similar to Plautus' Aulularia and Molière's The Miser

== Legacy ==
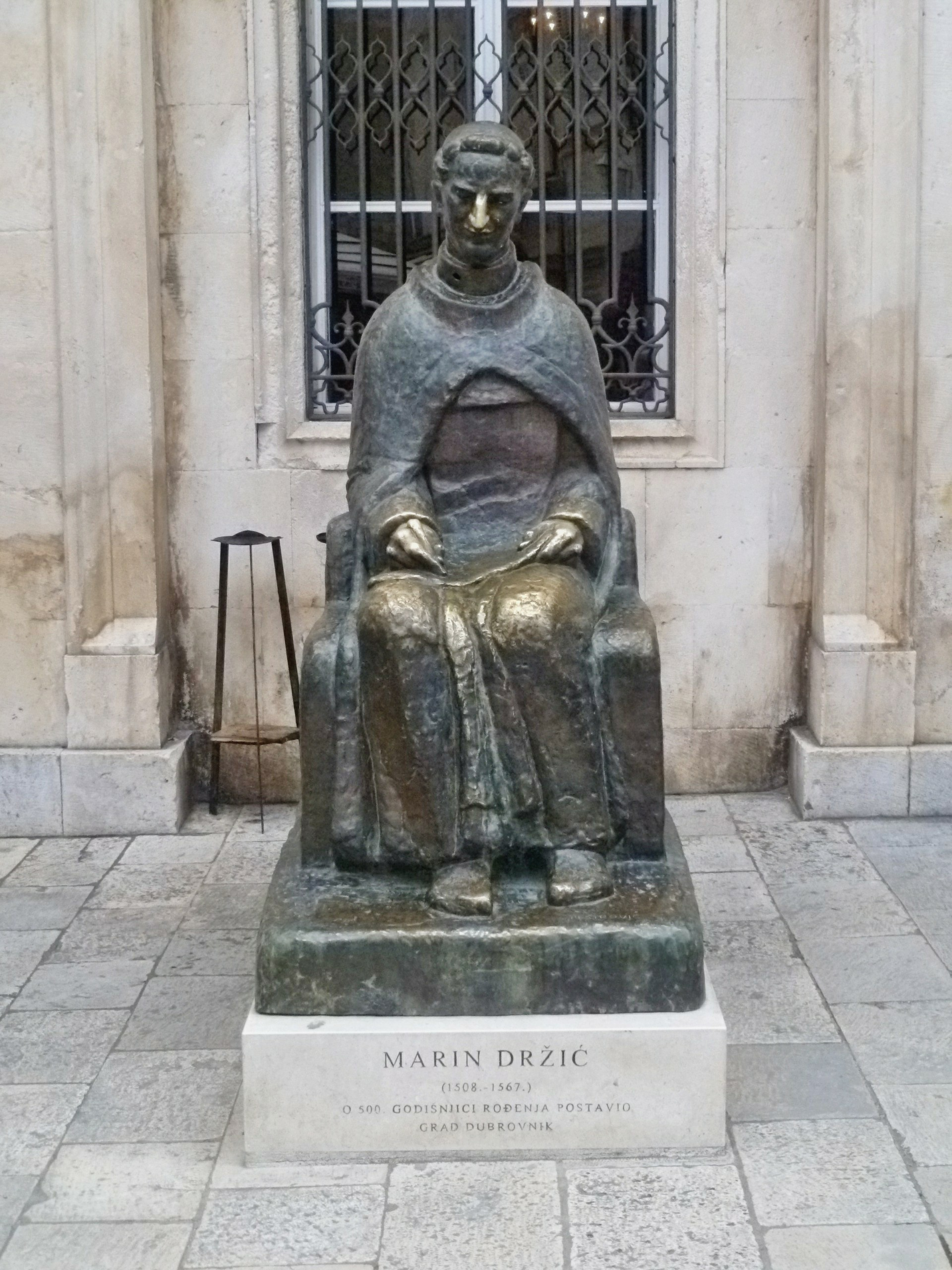
Statue of Marin Držić in Dubrovnik

Since its independence Croatia has awarded the Marin Držić Award for dramatic work. The Croatian Parliament also declared 2008 the Year of Marin Držić, as it is the 500th anniversary of his birth. An avenue in Zagreb is named after him. In Draškovićeva street (centre of Zagreb) there is a scenical stage named after Marin's nickname Vidra. Nicknames are given for various reasons. In Croatian the word vidra can also refer to a person who is perfidious and resourceful.

== See also ==
- Libertas (film)
