= Rector's Palace, Dubrovnik =

Palace in Croatia

Coordinates: 42°38′25″N 18°06′39″E

Rector's Palace
- Knežev dvor
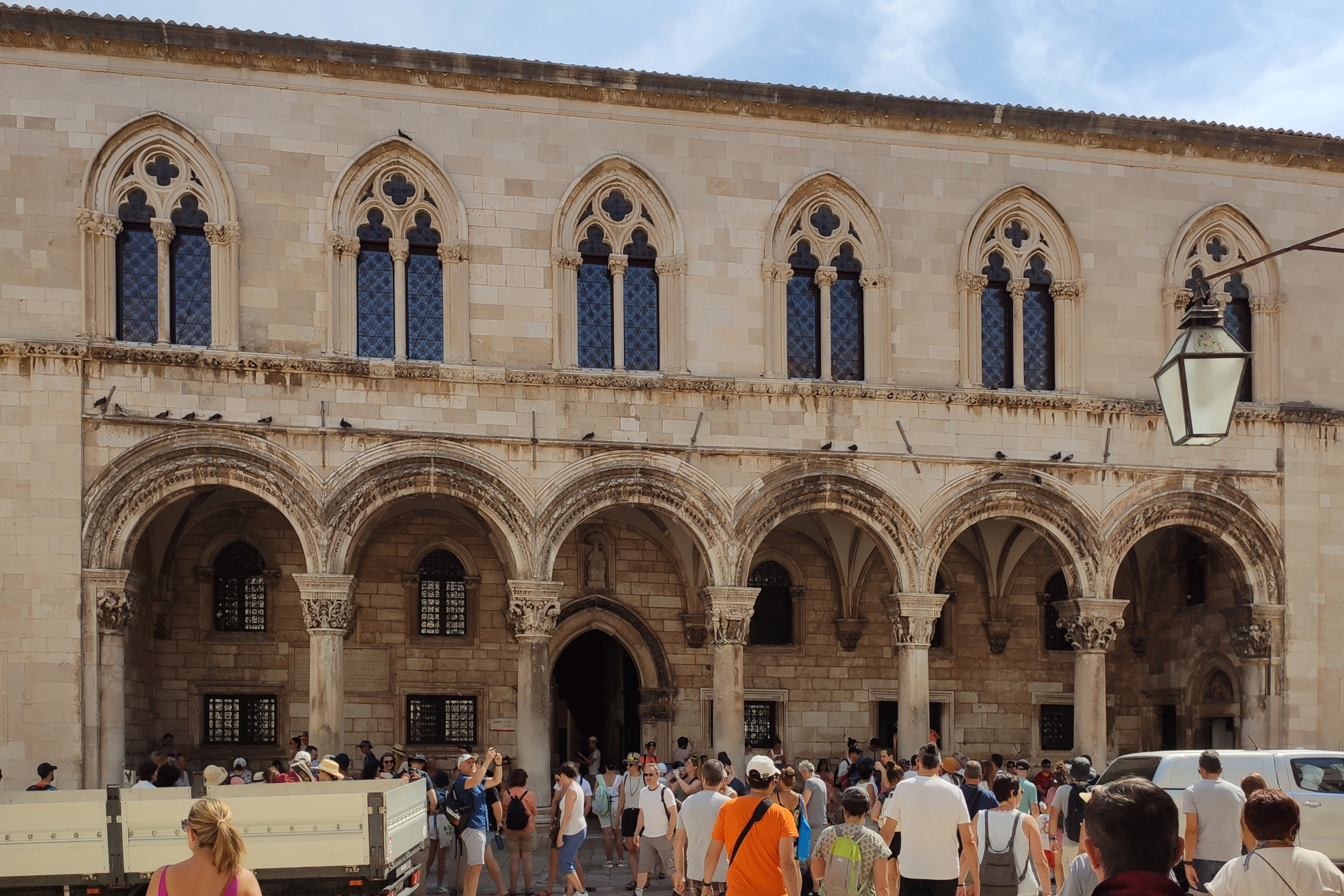
- Rector's Palace in Dubrovnik
- Interactive map of the Rector's Palace area
- Former names: Rector's Palace of the Republic of Ragusa

General information
- Architectural style: Gothic, Renaissance, Baroque
- Location: Dubrovnik, Croatia
- Current tenants: Cultural History Museum
- Completed: 1808; 218 years ago
- Owner: City of Dubrovnik

Design and construction
- Architects: Onofrio della Cava (reconstruction), Michelozzo (earlier rebuilding)

The Rector's Palace (Croatian: Knežev dvor; Italian: Palazzo dei Rettori) is a palace in the city of Dubrovnik that used to serve as the seat of the Rector of the Republic of Ragusa between the 14th century and 1808. It was also the seat of the Minor Council and the state administration. Furthermore, it housed an armoury, the powder magazine, the watch house and a prison.

== History ==
The Rector's Palace was built in the Gothic style, but it also has Renaissance and Baroque elements, harmoniously combining these elements.

Originally it was the site of a defence building in the early Middle Ages. It was destroyed by a fire in 1435 and the city-state decided to build a new palace. The job was offered to the master builder Onofrio della Cava of Naples, who had previously built the aqueduct. It became a Gothic building with ornaments sculpted by Pietro di Martino of Milan. A gunpowder explosion badly damaged the building in 1463. The renewal was offered to the architect Michelozzo of Florence. But he was rejected in 1464 because his plans were too much in the style of the Renaissance. Other builders continued the work. The capitals of the porch were reshaped in the Renaissance style, probably by Salvi di Michele of Florence. He continued the reconstruction from 1467 on. The building suffered damages from the earthquake of 1520 and again from the earthquake of 1667. The reconstruction was in the Baroque style. A flight of stairs and a bell were added in the atrium. In 1638 the Senate erected a monument to Miho Pracat (by Pietro Giacometti of Recanati), a rich shipowner from Lopud, who had bequeathed his wealth to Dubrovnik.

The History Department of the Museum of Dubrovnik has operated in the palace since 1872.

== Gallery ==
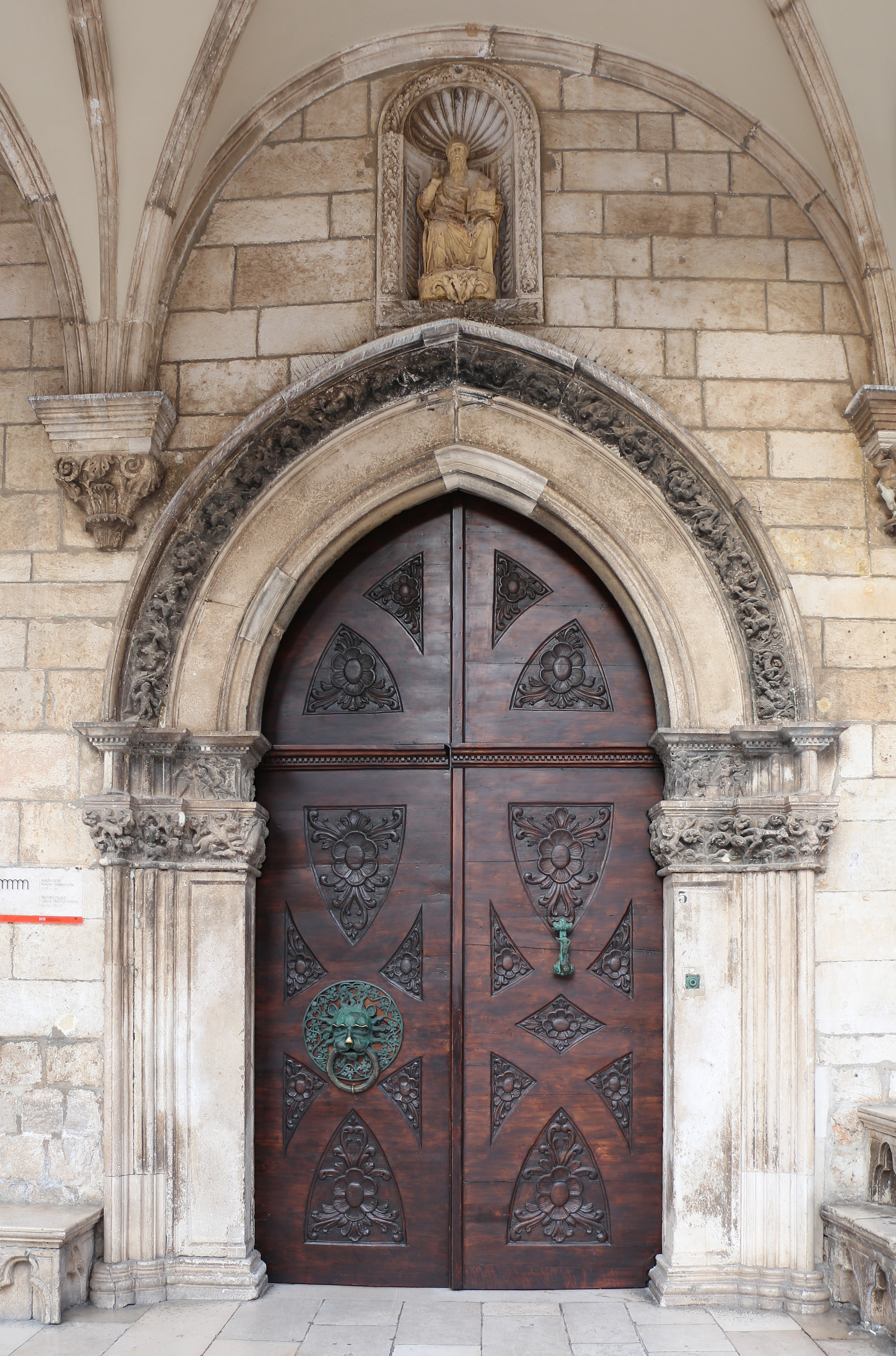
Doors entrance

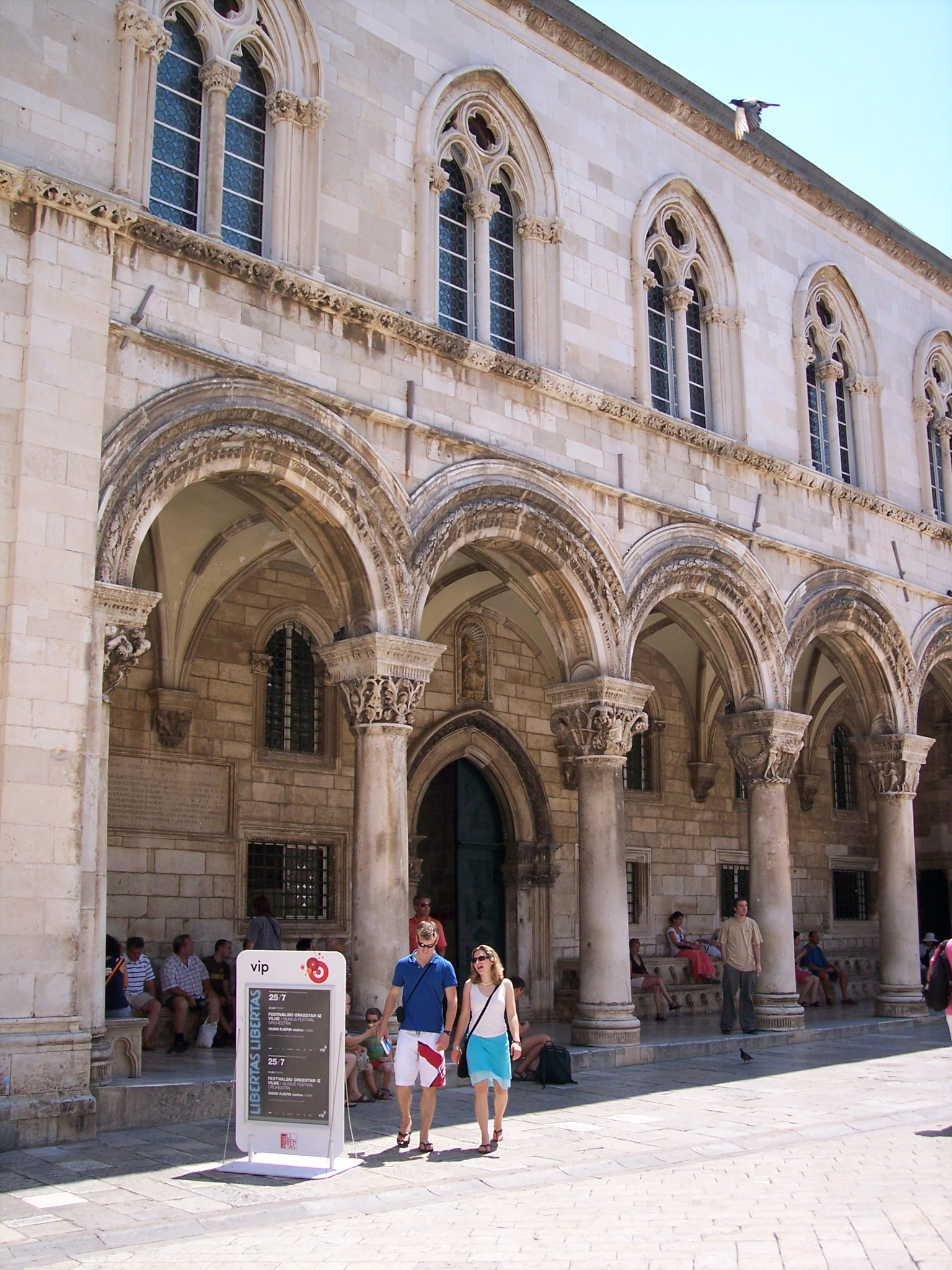
Facade details

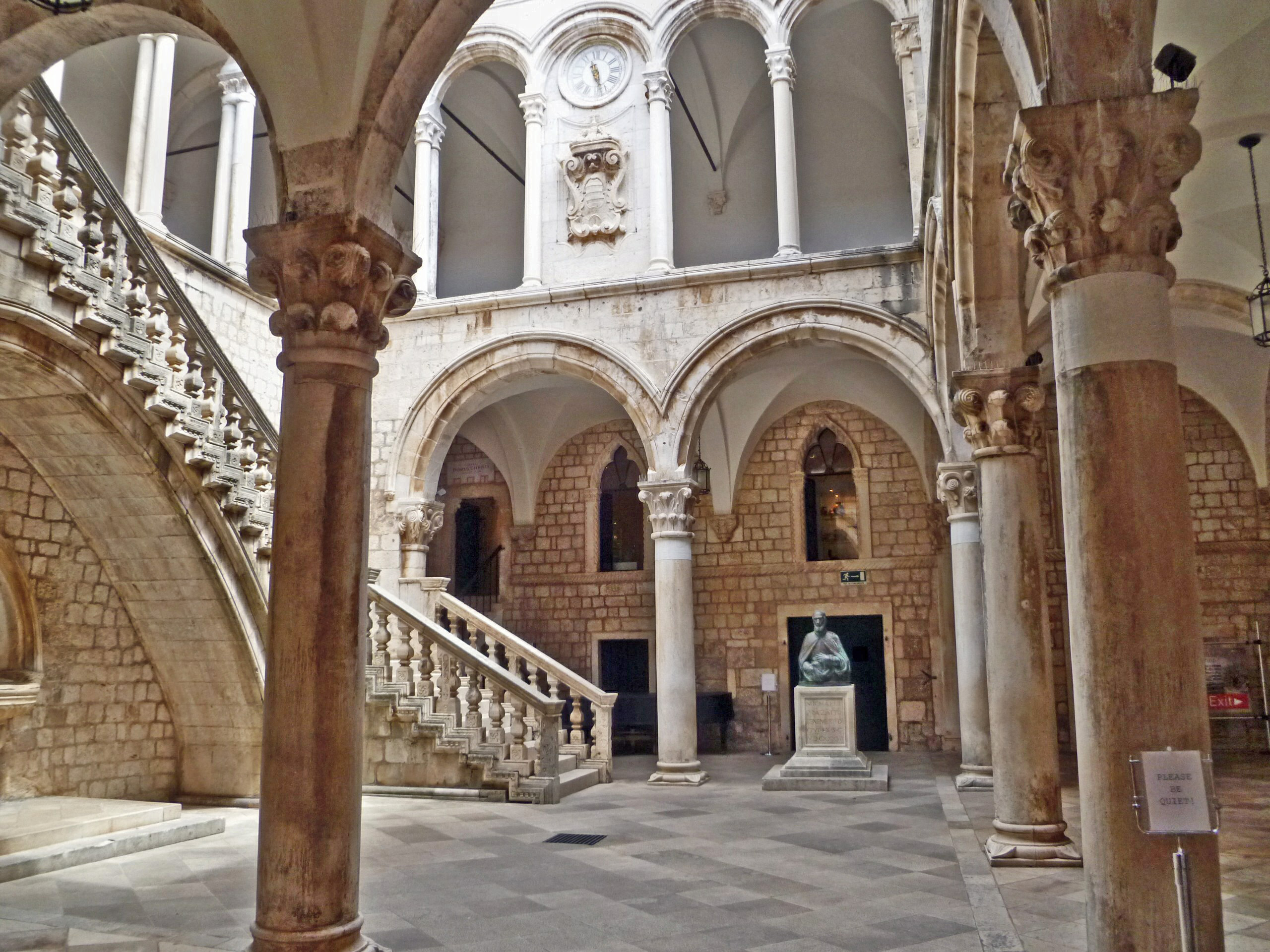
Atrium

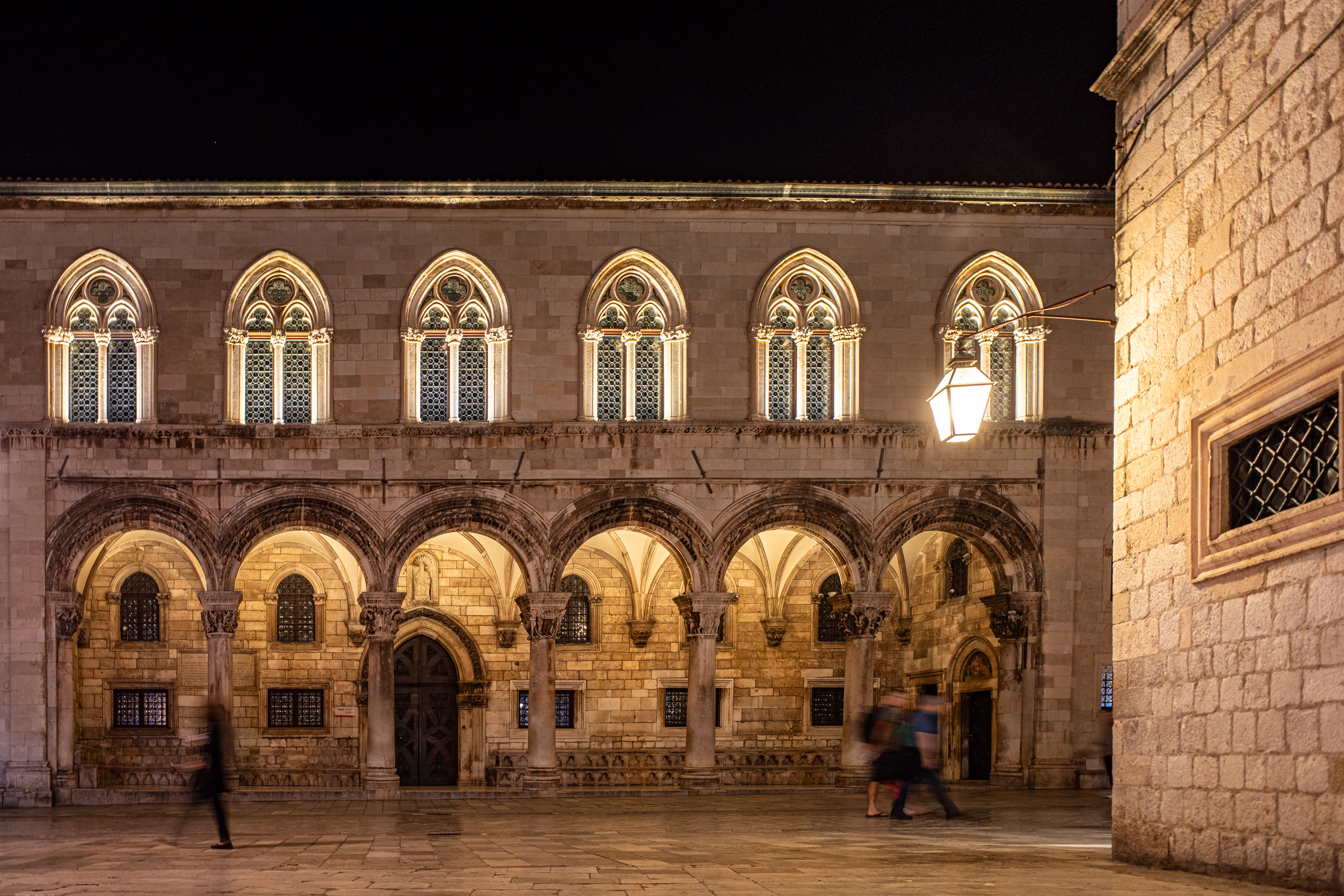
Palace at night
