= Frano Gundulić =

Ragusan nobleman and soldier

Frano Đivo Gundulić Francesco Giovanni Gondola
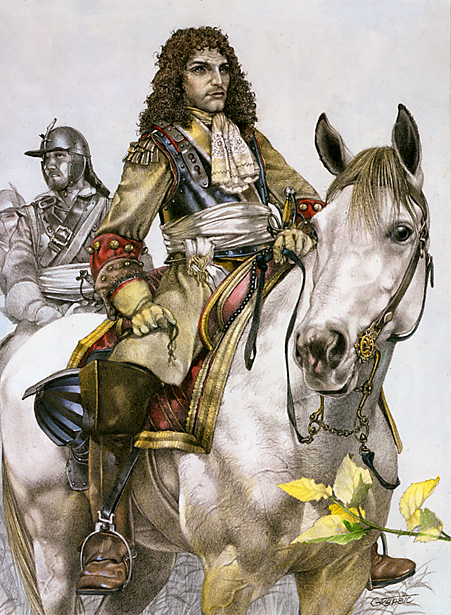
- Frano Đivo Gundulić 1683
- Born: 10 July 1630; Dubrovnik, Republic of Ragusa (today's Croatia)
- Died: 13 December 1700 (aged 70); Vienna, Habsburg monarchy (today's Austria)
- Military career
- Allegiance: Habsburg monarchy

Count Frano Gondola, Frano Đivo Gundulić or Francesco Giovanni Gondola; (born 10 July 1630, Dubrovnik - died 13 December 1700, Vienna) was a nobleman from Dubrovnik (then Republic of Ragusa), of the House of Gundulić.

== Biography ==
He was a child of famous Croatian poet Ivan Gundulić and his wife Nika, née Sorkočević/Sorgo/ (†1644). He joined the Austrian Army where he served as a military officer.

In 1655 Frano participated on a diplomatic mission to Moscow. In his personal diary account, he noted that the Russian Tzar Alexis I of Russia was very happy that one of the leading envoys was of Slavic descent ("od slovinskoga iesika") so that he could speak his own language without the use of an interpreter.

Frano Gundulić wrote from Vienna on 22 May 1672 to his friend Marko Bassegli to ask him to get the Republic to name him Duke and as a result to name Trpanj Dukedom of St. Michael of Trpanj. This was necessary because of his position in Vienna. In February 1679, the Austrian companies became reduces since 12 in 6 companies and soon in 3 into the regiments Kaunitz and Hallewyl. However also still 1679 dissolved and together with move Gundulić divided into the regiments Mercy, Taaffe and Churprinz and was finally made Commandant of Kürassierregiment since 1682–1699.

He also participated in the Battle of Vienna under the Polish King Jan III Sobieski in 1683. He became Generalfeldwachtmeister on 27 July 1682 and Feldmarschall-Leutnant on 4 September 1685.

The family then obtained fiefdoms from Leopold I, Holy Roman Emperor. He first married Maria Bobali (daughter of Marin Bobali), who died soon with the first child. His second marriage was with Countess Maria Victoria (Octavia) Strozzi on 22 April 1674 (d.d. 257, 80, folio 282 Neues Jahrbuch)., they had two children, Frano Gundulić,(+1717)k.k General der. Cav. and Šiško Gundulić, k.k Kriegsdiensten. He died in the Renngasse palace in Vienna 1700.

== See also ==
- Republic of Ragusa
- List of notable Ragusans
- Trpanj
- House of Gundulić
- Ivan Gundulić
- Dživo Šiškov Gundulić
- Šiško Gundulić
- Frano Getaldić-Gundulić
