= Šišmundo Gundulić =

Coat-of-arms of the House of Gundulić.

Šišmundo (Šiško) Gundulić, also Sigismondo Gondola, (c. July 1634– September 16, 1682) was a nobleman and poet from the Republic of Ragusa. He was the son of poet Ivan Gundulić and Nika Sorkočević, and brother of the Austrian Marshal Fran Dživo Gundulić. He served as a Rector of the Republic of Ragusa (Dubrovnik).

== Biography ==
Following the footsteps of his father, poet Ivan Gundulić, he also composed diverse poetry, poetry of both father and son was distinguished by the same similar elegance, some of their works were translated in the L´Epithalame de Catulle, other great musical works in 1662 Sunčanica. His first wife is unknown but he remarried with Katarina de Nale and had four children, Fran Gundulić II k.k General der Cav., Dživo Šiškov Gundulić (c. 1678 – c. 1721), Hieronymus Gundulić and Šiško Frano Gundulić II (*1682 + 1758) was one of the founders the first Austrian Lodge Zu den drei in Vienna 17 September 1742, on 7 March 1743 became Master of the Lodge Zu den drei Kanonen of Freemasonry. Šišmundo married Pier An. Crijević and had the last Gundulić male line, Šiško Dominko Gundulić, the daughter Katarina Gundulić married with Matej Getaldić, continued with the surname Getaldić-Gundulić, by adoption for the son of Katarina, Frano Augustin Getaldić-Gundulić.

He was also known by his bad habits, his public addiction to alcohol and his public scandals in the city of Dubrovnik. Šiško died in the Sponza Palace (Rector's Palace) in 1682.

== See also ==
- Republic of Ragusa
- List of notable Ragusans
- Trpanj
- House of Gundulić
- Ivan Gundulić
- Dživo Šiškov Gundulić
- Fran Dživo Gundulić
- Frano Getaldić-Gundulić
