= Dubravka (drama) =

Mythological drama

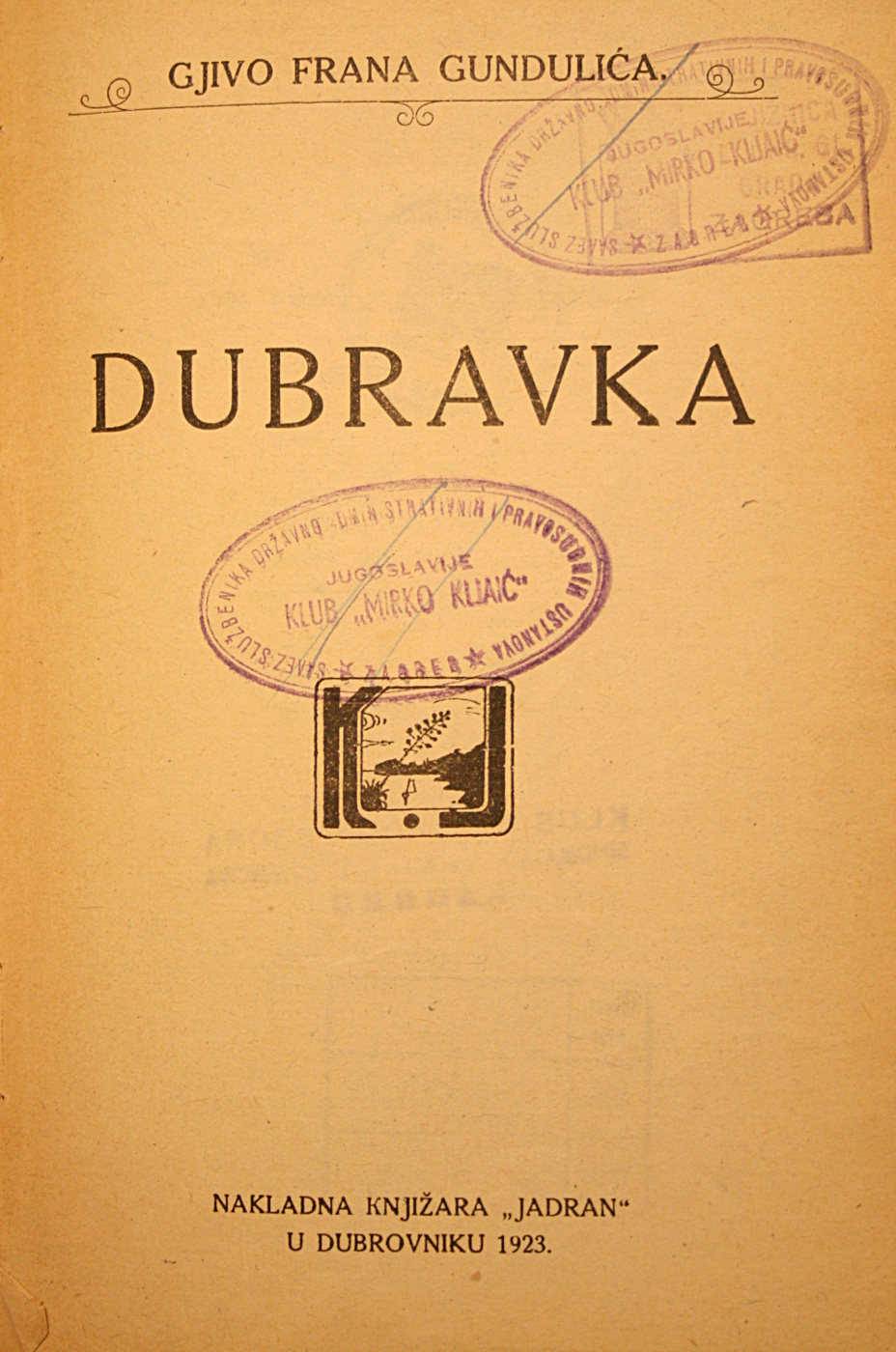
- Cover for the 1923 edition
- Author: Ivan Gundulić
- Genre: Drama
- Publication date: 17th century

Dubravka is a drama of mythological-pastoral content and allegorical meaning written in the mid-third decade of the 17th century by the Croatian author Ivan Gundulić. It consists of three acts with a total of 28 scenes and 1,696 verses, written in double rhymed dodecasyllables and octosyllables.

== Time and set ==
The plot of the entire play is set in the pastoral Dubrava in a mythical, pagan time of happiness and well-being, at the time that by its nature reminiscent the golden age of mankind. Historians of literature agree that Dubrava allegorically represents the city of Dubrovnik and/or the Republic of Ragusa as a country with a long tradition of independence and freedom, which cultivated since medieval times. Although Dubrava is some mythical country from the distant past, it represents the Republic of Ragusa because it values freedom as the highest human value, the biggest ideal and virtue that man can reach during his transient life.

The story begins at dawn, symbolically at the time of the birth of a new day but the expected day, "gentle solemn day", a day dedicated to freedom and its glory and value, comes only once a year which makes all the characters desperately wanting it. It's a day "in which we here make a shrine to sweet freedom", in which the ideals and virtues are above everyday life and its routine, ordinariness.

In addition to real-time, the play has a lot of connections with the historical background of Gundulić's time. The strongest and most famous connection with historical events is the motive of the Dalmatian fishermen who come from the land occupied by the Venetians, to a free and independent Dubrava, allegorical Dubrovnik, the symbol of Croatian circumstances at the time due to many attacks by the Ottomans, Venetians, Hungarians, Austrians, French and others. Dubrovnik thus becomes an allegorical port of salvation for the Croatian people, but also a role model and an inspiration in the fight against the greedy enemies.

The theme of the play is a fictional old custom according to which every year a day is celebrated in honor of the goddess of liberty. On that day, a wedding is officiated between the most beautiful girl and the most beautiful young men chosen by town judges.

On that eventful day, an old fisherman came from Dalmatia to Dubrovnik. His figure clearly shows the difference between the free Dubrovnik and Venetian-occupied Dalmatia. In addition to the character of fishermen, the drama shows other minor characters: satyrs Divjak (lit. savage) and Vuk (lit. wolf), and shepherdesses Zagorka and Pelinka, who served as an allegory Gundulić used to depict social vices and immorality in Dubrovnik.

Main characters, Dubravka and Miljenko, are nice and noble young couple on whose fate Gundulić builds the dramatic storyline. Instead of the expected choice of Miljenko as the most beautiful young men, judges choose ugly but rich, Grdan (lit. maleficent) who bribed them with gold. Grdan, however, fails in his plan because of the interference of god Lero who causes shakes and thunder and shades flames on the fire just before the wedding ceremony. At the moment in which Miljenko enters the church, shakes and thunder cease, and the fire flares up again which is interpreted as Lero's sign that Miljenko, and not Grdan, should become Dubravka's husband.

In the last scene of the play, on the feast of freedom, priest first offers symbolic votive gift - releasing from a cage birds of the god of love - followed by the appearance of Miljenko with an olive branch and Dubravka with a rose. At the end, characters symbolized disadvantages of Dubrovnik society that threatened the survival of freedom of Dubrovnik - Zagorko, Divjak, Vuk, Jeljenka, Gorštak - in honor of those same freedoms, sacrifice their shortcomings and vices, and their symbols, giving them as a votive offering.

Inscription on the edge of the Croatian 2 euro coin

The last six lines of the play feature a hymn to freedom. The hymn's first line, Croatian: "O lijepa, o draga, o slatka slobodo" (translated as "Oh beautiful, oh dear, oh sweet freedom) is used as an inscription on the edge of the Croatian €2 coin.

== Structure and plot ==
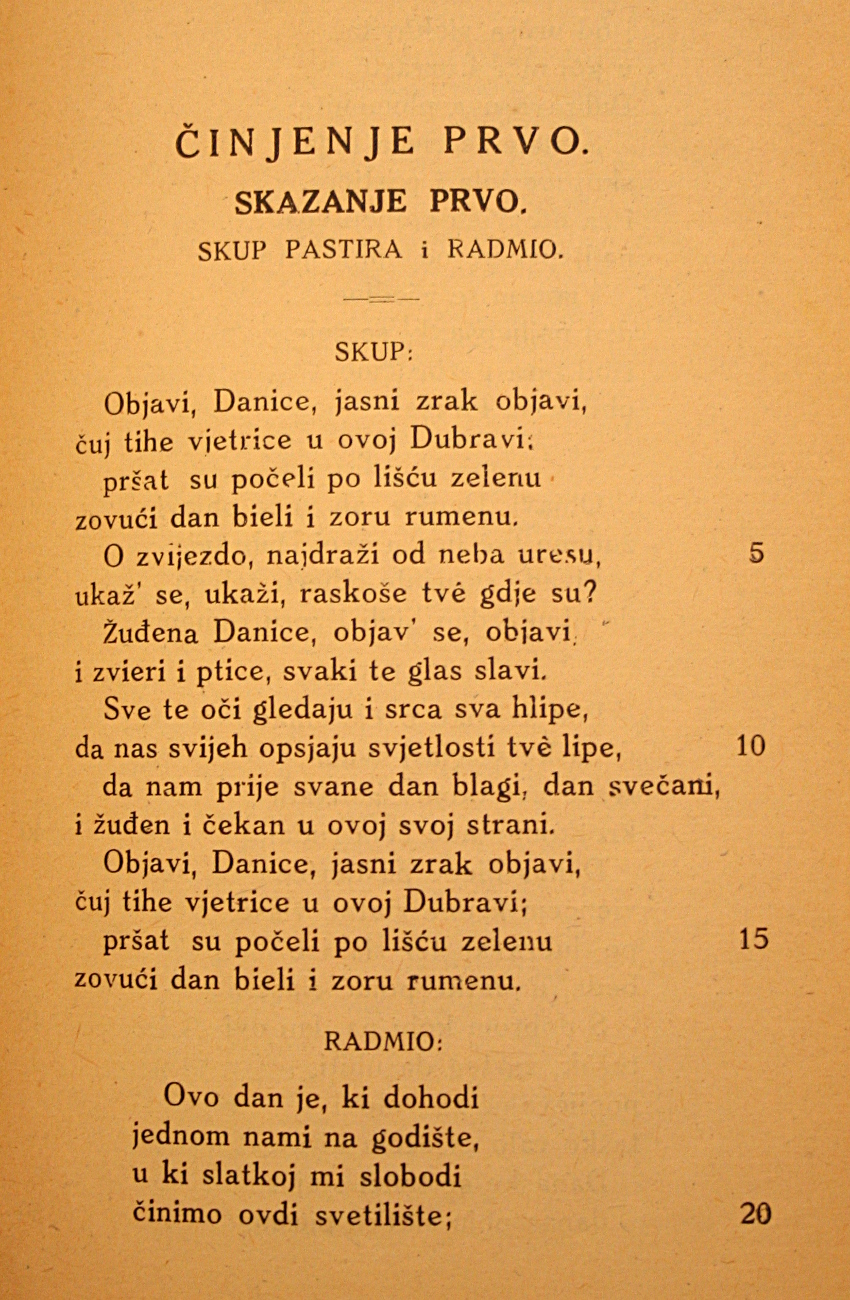
First reading, first saying

Ivan Gundulić, telling the story of the obstacles in the way of a happy love of Miljenko and Dubravka, follows the structure of the pastorals characteristic for his time, especially in Italy, unusually popular in the century in which infatuation between shepherd and shepherdess prevailed in literature. Dubravka was formed under the influence of the very popular plays like Guarini's Il pastor fido, Tasso's Aminta and Sanazzaro's Arcadia, which were at the time considered peaks of pre-Baroque literature. However, Gundulić expanded the structure of love plot with a storyline whose meaning points out the idea about the size of the dignity of Dubrovnik's freedom, freedom in which according to the righteous divine laws noble, beautiful and good govern, and there is no place for those who through their participation in the government want to annul these laws and customs.

With the acts of allegorizing mythological-pastoral world of drama, Dubravka expands the meaning of the plot on the contemporary political world of Dubrovnik and also expands with the convention certain limits of the pastoral and pastoral genre itself. At the same time, according to its ideal imaginary political vision of a prosperous city-state, Dubravka is a kind of utopia; it is a hymn to the ideal social order and to the best of all possible countries ruled by divine principles of fairness, honesty, beauty, and goodness. With the pastoral storyline set in a timeless, mythical world of eternal love and freedom, in the allegorical tone, Gundulić sets his work in the specific time and place and gives it the moral, political and ethical meaning of his time, noting also its advantages and disadvantages.

The structure of Dubravka is characterized by the interplay of all three literary genres. Drama is expressed in the division of the ranks and sayings or three acts divided into sayings. The drama features can also be seen in the characters, scenic and numerous dialogues (a.k.a. dialog form) and in the usage of different types of verses. Epic features are expressed in the design and expansion of dramatic action, which is more often recounted than showed. In other words, Gundulić used narration more than the description in order to create drama, which led to the loss of the vividness. This can be seen in the denouement (Lero's rebellion against unfair and unreasonable Grdan) which does not appear on the scene as a dramatic picture but is recounted by a character. The plot itself, the story about the well-being of the golden age of human existence, is epic by its elements. In the chanting of love, happiness, and prosperity, Dubravka is revealed as distinctly lyrical work, sometimes with Petrarch's descriptions of beauty.

== Allegory interpretations ==
Among the most important historians of literature who mentioned Dubravka in their works was Franjo Marković (1888), which interpreted Dubravka as an allegory for contemporary Dubrovnik's politics.

Branko Vodnik wrote that pastoral play Dubravka was "an anthem of Dubrovnik's freedom," adding that since the 10th century people of Dubrovnik celebrated Festivity of Saint Blaise as a folk festival and that scenes in Dubravka reminiscent of scenes from these festivities. Vodnik claims that the play's main motive of marriage between the most beautiful shepherd with the most beautiful shepherdess comes from the Venetian custom of the feast of St. Mark, when the Doge symbolically throw a ring into the sea and troth Venice, Queen of the Sea, with the Adriatic. In addition, Vodnik pointed out that Dubrava is an allegory of Dubrovnik.

Mihovil Kombol noted that in many Dubrovnik works, including Dubravka, a man of politics often appears due to the fact that most of the poets of Dubrovnik, including Gundulić himself, were of noble origin. Therefore, in scenes of Dubravka, Gundulić speaks more as a nobleman worried about "common good" rather than as a poet. Kombol considered that the main initiator of Gundulić's work was his religious and political beliefs which were never separated one from another. Allegories of the characters would be: Grdan - rotten rich man, Dubrava - Dubrovnik, shepherds - nobility, Dubravka - Dubrovnik authorities.

Jakša Ravlić in his discussions stressed that the bribed court was a "court of public opinion" as if it were a judgment of nobility, Gundulić would probably, being the member of the court and loyalist of the Republic of Ragusa himself, tried to repair the embarrassing situation in which the court found itself, but he hasn't done that in Dubravka, but he instead made it known to the general public. Thus, the character of Grdan couldn't be an allegory for a nobleman, but for a member of another class, dangerous for the nobility, that nobility feared because of its richness and influence. Therefore, the question of Grdan in Dubravka is an internal matter of the Republic of Ragusa.

Zdenko Zlatar disagrees with Ravlić because he thinks that we cannot talk about the conflict between aristocracy and younger bourgeoisie for the rule over Dubrovnik, given the fact that the crisis of the nobility of the time was primarily political in nature, so Gundulić only condemned the split within his own ruling class, but hasn't refuted pretensions of the Dubrovnik's middle class.

The Dalmatian fisherman is a character that warns about "bad situation in Dalmatia under Venetian rule, the greatest enemy of Dubrovnik, in order to stress better situation in Dubrovnik." Fisherman "emphasizes the fact that Dubrovnik is an independent state ruled by local people with Turkish leadership being only formal with a cost of paying tribute." Free Dubrovnik contrasts with non-free Dalmatia under Venetian rule. Miljenko is against the "gift" for Dubravka, with "gift" perhaps being an allusion to the gifts "that some nobles received from rich citizens for their services" or "the state borrowing money from local rich people". According to Ravlić's opinion, Miljenko was a figure that spoke in a poet's name against "accepting citizens among the nobility, and consequently against the possibility that Grdan should marry Dubravka, i.e. the power into his own hands". Because of the possibility that Gundulić remained isolated in his opinions (as Miljenko on stage), he set problem in the mythical world in order for it to be resolved by gods. Also, Miljenko, due to his uncertainty in the proclamations of love toward Dubravka as his predetermined companion, brings kind of inappropriate dramatic turn to the pastoral. The question is: are Miljenko's words even words of a man who is in love with a woman? Ljubdrag's objurgation of Zagor, because he left his flock and ran away, is an allusion to the economic crisis of Dubrovnik of the time, caused by free citizens fleeing with their possessions and herds, which mostly affected the nobility who lived from estates on which those mercenaries worked.

According to its content, Dubravka is a social satire against progressive and justified demands of young citizens of Dubrovnik; just because of that it also at the same time defends the nobility status quo. It is, therefore, a hymn to the landowning freedom which was conceived and implemented by Dubrovnik nobility. So Dubravka, besides the known elements and some conventional characters, also has an original clip of domestic life in its content. The theme of the play is a fictional old custom according to which each year a day is celebrated in honor of the goddess of liberty.

== Stage reception of Dubravka ==
The premiere of Gundulić's Dubravka took place in 1628 in Dubrovnik "in front of Dvor". The first modern performance was staged by the Croatian National Theater in 1888, on the three hundredth anniversary of the poet's birth, so the show was performed four times until February of the same year. Until 1918, it was performed additional fifty times in Zagreb.

Most significant director of Dubravka was Adam Mandrović, followed by Stjepan Miletić who set it in the St. Mark's Square in 1895 as part of the national repertoire with an emphasis on realistic scenery. In early August 1913, Josip Bach set Dubravka in the Maksimir Park as the play of "ambient" theater.

After this experiment, Dubravka returned to the conventional theater by director Branko Gavella, first time in 1920 (initially only fragments as part of a theatrical evening, and then in the same year as a complete drama), accompanied by music composed by Ivan Zajc and Jakov Gotovac (which have been used before) and with new musical stocks by Antun Dobronić (at the premiere in 1923) and Ivo Malec. Tito Strozzi set Dubravka in 1928 in Zagreb with new Gotovac's music, then in 1933 in Dubrovnik, for the first time in the same place where the first performance took place. Strozzi was setting Dubravka until 1956. Next set of Dubravka was directed by Ivica Kunčević in 1973, with reruns in 1974 in Zagreb. After this performance, Dubravka wasn't in the repertoire until 1989, when it was set in Komedija Theatre by Darko Tralić.

Croatian National Theatre in Zagreb added Dubravka into its program as a permanent play and with a permanent exhibition in the early 1990s. The play was directed by Petar Selem who adjusted it to the war-torn Croatia and the world in which there was fear of terrorism and in which the political corruption has become part of the government and every aspect of society. The scenery was created by the famous Italian set designer Raffaele del Savio, while the music was taken from the sheet music and manuscripts of Jakov Gotovac. The original conductor Zoran Juranić was on several occasions replaced by visiting European and local conductors. Roles: ''Ivan Gundulić'' - Božidar Alić, ''Fishermen'' - Kruno Šarić and Zijad Gračić, ''Miljenko'' - Radovan Ruždjak, ''Dubravka'' - Barbara Vicković.

== Bibliography ==
- Ivan Gundulić: Dubravka, Dubrovnik, 1837.
- Ivan Gundulić: Dubravka: pastirska igra u 3 čina, s uvodom Franje Markovića, Zagreb, 1888. [Ivan Gundulić: Dubravka: pastoral play in 3 acts, with an introduction by Franjo Marković, Zagreb, 1888.]
- Ivan Gundulić: Dubravka, u: Djela Dživa Frana Gundulića, prir. Đ. Körbler, Zagreb, ^{3}1938., str. 261. – 318. (Stari pisci hrvatski, knj. IX) [Ivan Gundulić: Dubravka, in: works by Dživo Fran Gundulić, edited by Đuro Körbler, Zagreb, 1938., p. 261. – 318. (Old Croatian writers, vol. IX)]
- Ivan Gundulić: Dubravka; Suze sina razmetnoga, prir. Albert Haller, Zagreb, 1944. [Ivan Gundulić: Dubravka; Tears of the Prodigal Son, Albert Haller, Zagreb, 1944.]
- Ivan Gundulić: Suze sina razmetnoga; Dubravka; Ferdinandu Drugome od Toskane, prir. J. Ravlić, Zagreb, ^{2}1964 (Pet stoljeća hrvatske književnosti, knj. 12) [Ivan Gundulić: Tears of the Prodigal Son; Dubravka; To the Ferdinand the Great of Tuscany, edited by J. Ravlić, Zagreb, 21964 (Five Centuries of Croatian Literature, Vol. 12)]
- Ivan Gundulić: Osman; Dubravka; Suze sina razmetnoga, prir. Zlata Bojović, Beograd, 2001. [Ivan Gundulić: Osman; Dubravka; Tears of the Prodigal Son, edited by Zlatko Bojović, Beograd, 2001.]
- Ivan Gundulić: Kralj od pjesnika, prir. D. Fališevac, Zagreb, 2005, str. 101. – 180. [Ivan Gundulić: King from Poets, edited by D. Fališevac, Zagreb, 2005, p. 101 – 180]
- Ivan Gundulić, Suze sina razmetnoga, Dubravka, prir. Dunja Fališevac, Školska knjiga, Zagreb, 1999. (2. izdanje) [Ivan Gundulić: Tears of the Prodigal Son, Dubravka, edited by Dunja Fališevac, Školska knjiga, Zagreb, 1999]

== Literature ==
- Batušić, Nikola: Narav od Fortune: studije o starohrvatskoj drami i kazalištu, Zagreb, 1991.
- Fališevac, Dunja: Dubrovnik- otvoreni i zatvoreni grad: studije o dubrovačkoj književnoj kulturi, Zagreb, 2007.
- Marković, Franjo: O Dubravci, drami Ivana Gundulića, Zagreb, 1888.
- Meštrović, Zrinka: Antroponimijsko čitanje Gundulićeve „Dubravke, Suvremena lingvistika, 27. – 28. (1988./1989.), p. 31 – 35
- Ravlić, Jakša: Odraz domaće stvarnosti u dubrovačkoj književnosti, Beogradski međunarodni slavistički sastanak, (15 – 21 September 1955), Beograd 1957., p. 653 – 658
- Ravlić Jakša: Rasprave iz starije hrvatske književnosti, Zagreb, 1970.
