= Đivo Šiškov Gundulić =

Coat-of-arms of the House of Gundulić

Đivo (Ivan) Šiškov Gundulić (also Giovanni di Sigismondo Gondola), (13 February 1678 – 13 December 1721) was a nobleman from the Republic of Ragusa, the son of Šišmundo (Šiško) Gundulić and Katarina Nale. He was the Rector of the Republic of Ragusa between 1696 and 1700. Following his father and his grandfather Ivan Gundulić, he also wrote poetry: Suze i tužbe Radmilove (1702), Radmio (1701), Oton (1707) and Filomena. He also composed diverse folklore songs, that have been preserved from generation to generation until today by the people of Dubrovnik.

== Life ==
Đivo was accused of raping a young Sephardic Jew, Luna Židovka on 13 March 1699. Đivo Šiškov Gundulić was engaged at the time to Maria Bosdari, and what happened after the raping young Luna Židovka (Protocol of the Conference that was held by the Council on Friday 13 March 1699). The Council found Gundulić guilty, all the Bosdari nobles were against him and wanted revenge. The sentence for Gundulić was expulsion from ragusan aristocracy, exile from the Republic, a ban on selling or to giving his estate, an increased punishment in the event of a repeated attack. The political confrontation between the aristocracy took place at the end of the 17th century, primarily between the Salamankezi and Sorbonezi ragusan patrician clans.

== See also ==
- Republic of Ragusa
- List of notable Ragusans
- Dubrovnik
- Dalmatia
- History of Dalmatia
- Trpanj
- House of Gundulić

== Sources ==
- Suze i tužbe Radmilove (1702), prepjev idile Sospiri d'Ergasto GB. Marina
- Radmio (1701), prepjev Tassove Aminte
- Oton (1707), melodrama
- Filomena, tragedija, druga iz Didone Jakete Palmotića, rađena po tal. noveli Gianfiore e Filomena.
- Ivan Šiškov Gundulić (2) / uredio Ivica Martinović. – Ilustr. – Nastavak tematskog bloka o Gunduliću iz br. 2/2001. – Bibliografske biljeske uz tekst. – Iz sadrzaja: Zapis o krstenju Ivana Šiškova Gundulića / prev. I. Martinovic. Iz ljetopisa Dubrovačkoga kolegija za g. 1695. / Simone Capitozzi. Kako se Ivan Siskov Gundulic vjerio s Marijom Bosdari i sto se potom zbilo / Đuro Bašić. Kazne za rod Bosdari nakon ranjavanja Ivana ŠiŠkova Gundulića ; Ivan Šiškov Gundulić i Luna Židovka ; Zapisnik sjednice Vijeca umoljenih odrzane u petak 13. ozujka 1699. ; Tri ocitovanja dubrovackih sefarda o miraznim dobrima njihovih supruga ; Ivan Šiškov Gundulić u izbornom zrvnju 1696.-1700. ; Cekinic (1731) vs. Appendini (1803) / I. Martinović. Ocitovanje o miraznim dobrima moje majke Kate Nale / Ivan Š. Gundulić. Ivan Š. Gundulić / Sebastijan Slade. U: Dubrovnik. – ISSN 0353-8559. – N.s. 12 (2001), 3 ; str. 5–64. Nakon ranjavanja Ivana Šiškova Gundulića Vijece umoljenih donijelo je niz teskih osuda koje su zahvatile cijeli pridruzeni vlastelinski rod Božidarević: iskljucenje iz dubrovačkog plemstva, izgon iz domovine, zabrana prodaje i ustupanja nekretnina i posjeda i kazna za mozebitni ponovljeni napad. najtezi sukob medju dubrovackom vlastelom na kraju 17. stoljeca zrcali duboki rascjep izmedju Salamankeza i Sorboneza medju dubrovačkim plemićima.
