= Duba Pelješka =

- Village
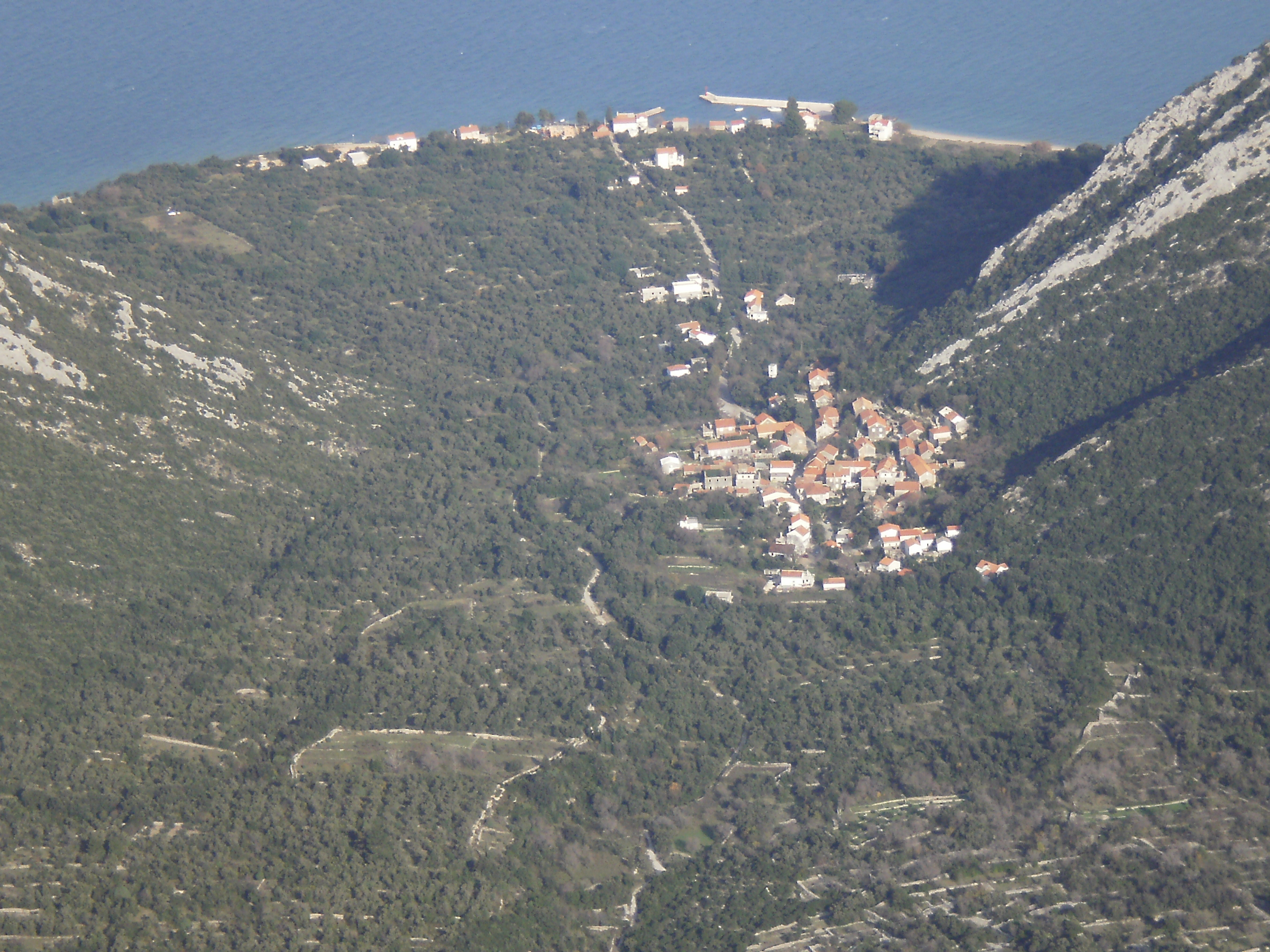
- Interactive map of Duba Pelješka
- Location within Croatia
- Coordinates: 43.0106774°N 17.1303486°E
- Country: Croatia
- County: Dubrovnik-Neretva County
- Municipality: Trpanj

Area
  - Total: 4.0 sq mi (10.3 km^{2})

Population (2021)
  - Total: 29
  - Density: 7.3/sq mi (2.8/km^{2})
- Time zone: UTC+1 (CET)
  - Summer (DST): UTC+2 (CEST)

Duba Pelješka is a village in Croatia.The village is situated on the Pelješac peninsula.

== Demographics ==
According to the 2021 census, its population was 29.
