= Paladino Gondola =

Ragusan diplomat and merchant

- Born: Paladino de Gondola; Republic of Ragusa
- Other names: Paladin Gundulić (in Croatian)
- Occupations: Diplomat; merchant

Paladino Gondola (fl. 1423–1472) was a Ragusan diplomat and merchant, a member of noble Gondola noble family.

== Biography ==
Gondola traded cereals only and supplied Dubrovnik with cereals from Southern Italy and Sicily. Two consecutive rulers of the Kingdom of Naples, Alfonso and Ferdinand, granted Gondola with privileges to trade in cereals from Italy. Gondola was imprisoned for some time in 1423 by vojvoda Radosav Pavlović.

In 1425, when Eric of Pomerania, who ruled over the Kalmar Union of northern Europe, visited Dubrovnik on his way to Holy Land and again on returning to Denmark, he wanted to buy a Venetian merchantman galley (Italian: galere da mercato). Since Eric did not have enough money, Dubrovnik (the Republic of Ragusa) provided him with 2,000 ducats in credit, equipped the galley for him and armed its escort of 25 armed people, placed under Gondola's command.

In 1433 the Republic of Ragusa sent Gondola and Andrija Bobaljević over to congratulate the Serbian Despot Đurađ Branković because his daughter Mara had been betrothed to Sultan Murad II of the Ottoman Empire. They were also mandated to ask for his help in dealing with the sultan, Dubrovnik's overlord.

Paladin was appointed, on August 4, 1434, as one of the supervisors of the works on water supply for Dubrovnik. He had by then also earned the trust of Ferdinand I of Naples, who engaged him to maintain a connection with Albanian warlord Skanderbeg.

In 1458, the Republic of Ragusa sent Gondola and Paladin Lukarić to visit the Ottoman sultan in Skopje. He was assigned the sum of 1,500 ducats, the Ragusan harač, and the sultan issued a charter with benefits for Ragusan merchants.

Between 1470 and 1476, Despot Đurađ's daughter Kantakuzina Katarina Branković repeatedly attempted to collect back the 500 ducats that Gondola owed her. She was supported in this effort by sultan Murad II and his wife Mara, but she was in the end unsuccessful.

Another of Gondola's missions happened in 1472. At the time, Vlatko Hercegović, head of the Duchy of Saint Sava, was building a church in Herceg Novi with financial help from the Republic of Ragusa. Gondola was one of three Ragusan officials in charge for this project.

== Family ==
Paladin, a member of Gondola family, was twice married. For a short while, he was married to Maria of the Caboga family. On November 25, 1458, he betrothed Mirussa of the Bona family.

== Annotations ==
His full name was Italian: Paladino di Marino de Gondola, shortened Paladino de Gondola. In Croatian: Paladin Gundulić.
