= Gornja Vrućica =

- Village
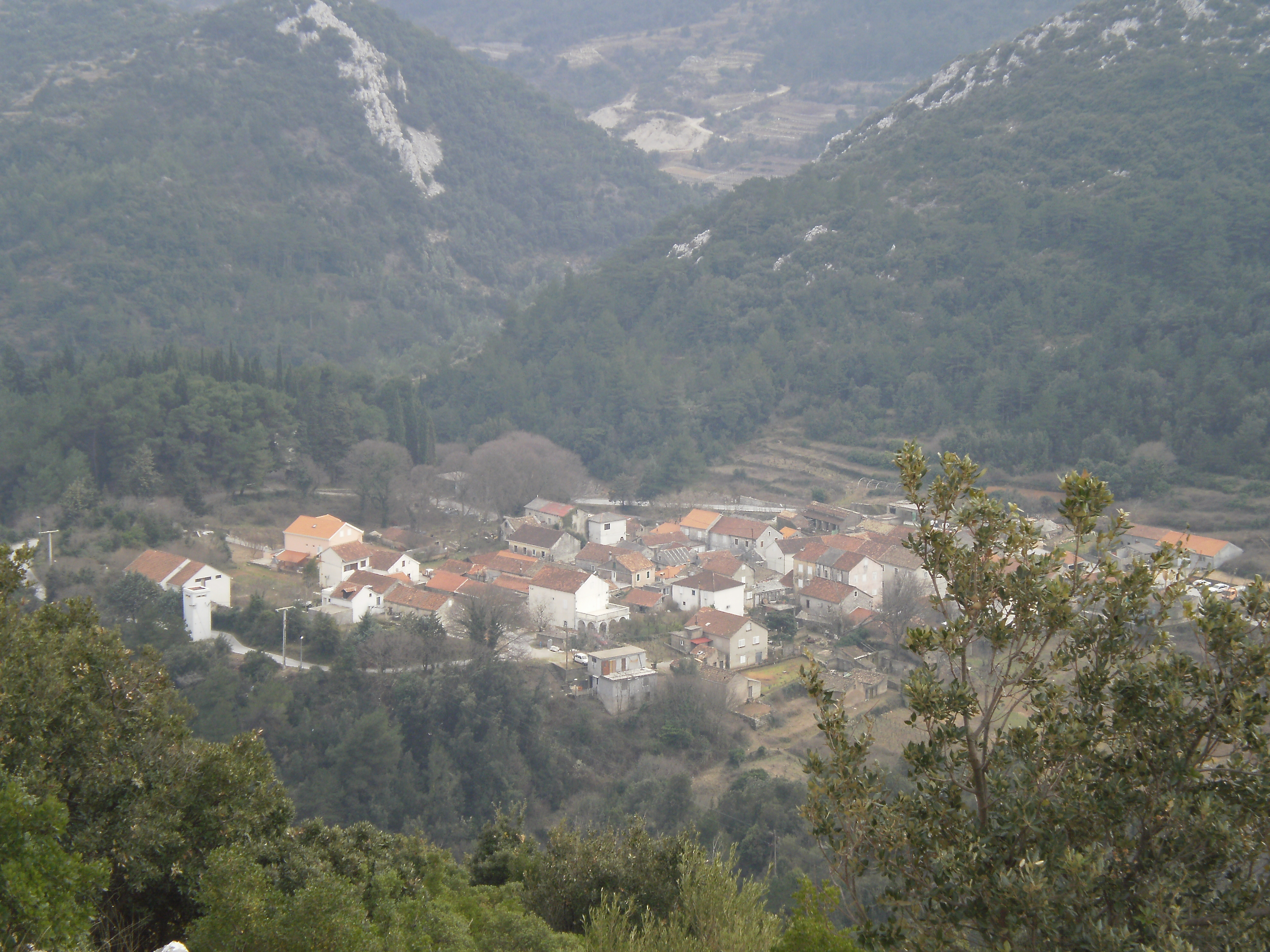

- Location within Croatia
- Coordinates: 42.9928342°N 17.238888°E
- Country: Croatia
- County: Dubrovnik-Neretva County
- Municipality: Trpanj

Area
  - Total: 2.7 sq mi (6.9 km^{2})

Population (2021)
  - Total: 37
  - Density: 14/sq mi (5.4/km^{2})
- Time zone: UTC+1 (CET)
  - Summer (DST): UTC+2 (CEST)

Gornja Vrućica is a village in Croatia. The village is situated on the Pelješac peninsula.

== Demographics ==
According to the 2021 census, its population was 37.
