= Sunčanica =

Sunčanica is a historical opera composed by Boris Papandopulo, with a libretto by Marko Soljačić based on Ivan Gundulić's Osman and his son Šišmundo Gundulić, who continued the Osman, about the Sunčanica history.

It was first performed at the Croatian National Theatre in Zagreb (then the Croatian State Theatre in Zagreb) on June 13, 1942. The opera was produced by Branko Gavella, choreographed by Ana Roje and Oskar Harmoš, and its main role was played by Srebrenka Jurinac.

In 2008, the opera was fully performed for the first time in 62 years when it opened the 16th Zajc's Days festival at the Croatian National Theatre Ivan pl. Zajc in Rijeka.
