= Donja Vrućica =

- Village
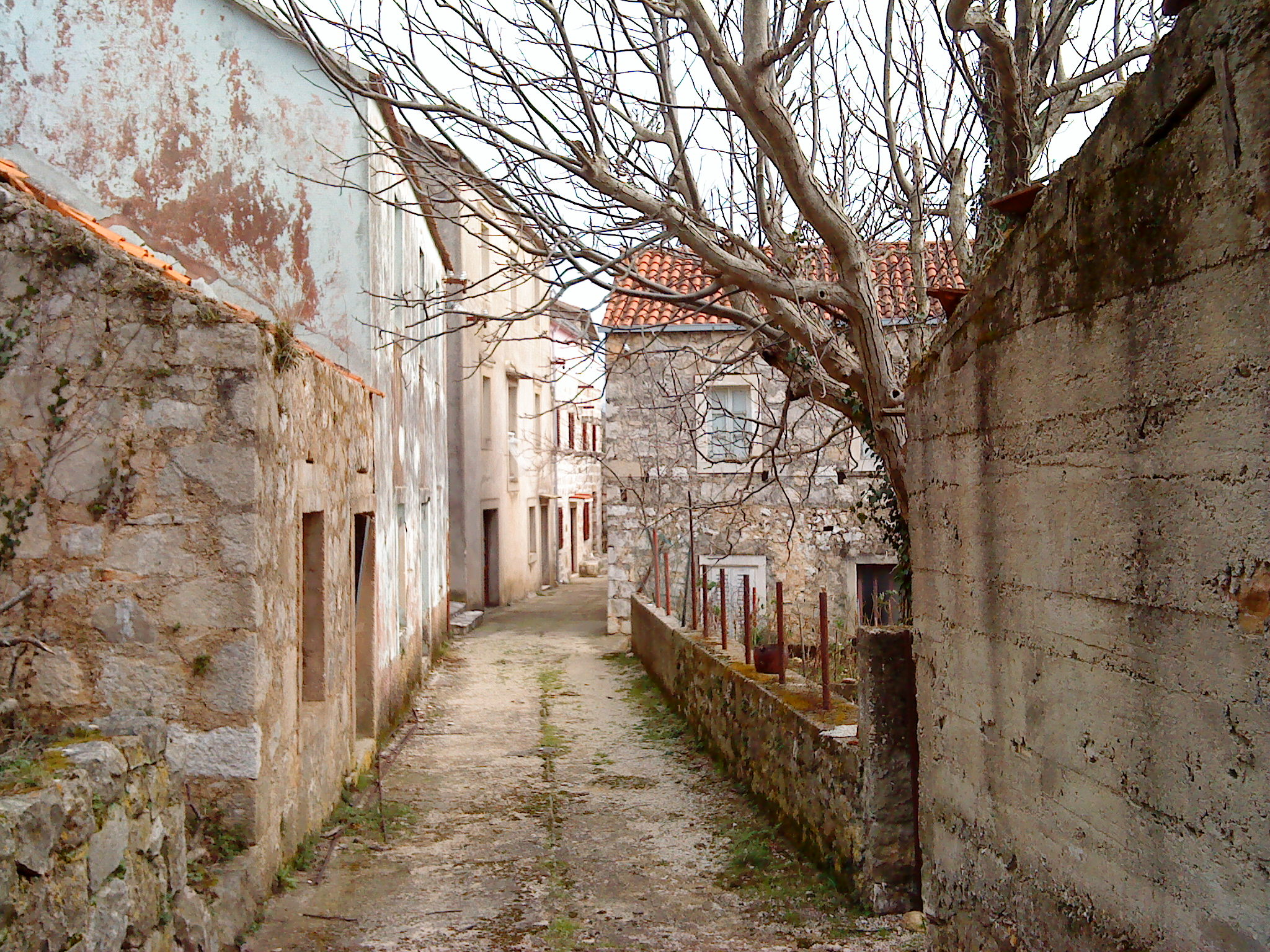

- Location within Croatia
- Coordinates: 43.0055377°N 17.1934011°E
- Country: Croatia
- County: Dubrovnik-Neretva County
- Municipality: Trpanj

Area
  - Total: 5.1 sq mi (13.1 km^{2})

Population (2021)
  - Total: 23
  - Density: 4.5/sq mi (1.8/km^{2})
- Time zone: UTC+1 (CET)
  - Summer (DST): UTC+2 (CEST)

Donja Vrućica is a village in Croatia.The village is situated on the Pelješac peninsula.

== Demographics ==
According to the 2021 census, its population was 23.
