= Trpanj =

- Municipality
- Općina Trpanj; Trpanj Municipality
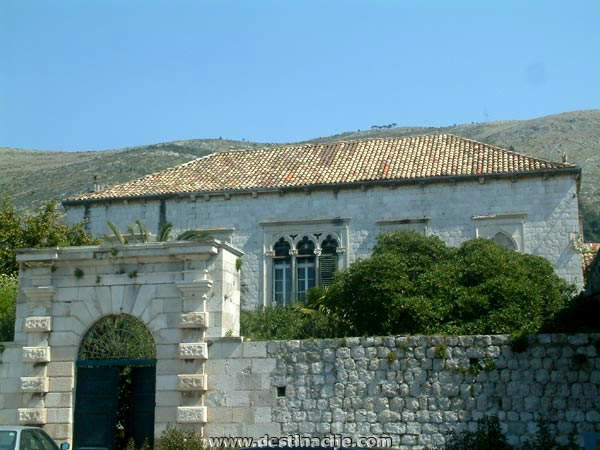
- The Getaldić-Gundulić house
- Interactive map of Trpanj
- Location within Croatia
- Coordinates: 43°0′0″N 17°16′30″E
- Country: Croatia
- County: Dubrovnik-Neretva County

Area
  - Municipality: 13.7 sq mi (35.6 km^{2})
  - Urban: 2.0 sq mi (5.2 km^{2})

Population (2021)
  - Municipality: 683
  - Density: 49.7/sq mi (19.2/km^{2})
  - Urban: 594
  - Urban density: 300/sq mi (110/km^{2})
- Time zone: UTC+1 (CET)
  - Summer (DST): UTC+2 (CEST)
- Postal code: 20 240
- Area code: 020
- Licence plate: DU
- Website: trpanj.hr

Trpanj is a municipality in Dubrovnik-Neretva County in south-eastern Croatia.

== History ==
=== Etymology ===
According to one theory the name is from the Croatian verb trpjeti, meaning "to suffer." Another theory said it is from δρεπάνη : drepánē, the Ancient Greek word for sickle, which is the shape formed by the cliffs surrounding the town's harbor.

=== Early history ===
The area has been inhabited since ancient times. Examples of prehistoric pottery, evidence that the site may have been inhabited by an urban-type society, were found on the slopes of Gradina, the small hill overlooking the port. Other traces of prehistoric humans were found on the St. Roko hill. Life in the area may not have been easy as it is located between barren cliffs to the north and the Miloševica, Viter and Prvač Dol hills to the south.

The first traces of Roman occupation were discovered in 1922, when a mosaic was uncovered in a park under the Gradina hill. In 1963, walls of a Roman “villa rustica” were found, as well as a base of a Roman column and an inscription from the 2nd or 3rd century AD. When the Romans occupied the area they encountered Illyrians, who were dwelling on the slopes of Gradina. According to the Dubrovnik historian Jakov Lukarić, the ancient fortress, Tarpano or Tarponio, was destroyed by Julius Caesar while he was fighting the Illyrians. As a result, the old inhabitants of Trpanj took the three towers as the town emblem. Other evidence of Roman presence was covered over the centuries by a thick layer of soil carried over the centuries by the Potok brook.

During the Goth rule of Dalmatia in the 6th century, Byzantine emperor Justinian I built a series of defenses along the coast, including the one on the top of Gradina, in an attempt to reclaim the lands lost to invading tribes and to ensure safe passage of trade. Throughout centuries the Neretva channel was a very important merchant sea route. Frequent changes of state boundaries never caused the traffic to stop. Greek vessels used the channel to transport ingredients for the production of incense to Corinth, while Romans mostly used it to trade wine in amphoras. Later Neretva princes imposed tributum pacis ("peace tribute")which meant that anyone trading in the area had to pay them a peace tribute.

On the remains of the ancient world the new Croatian inhabitants built their own monuments. For example, the first and most important church of medieval Trpanj, dedicated to St. Peter, was built on the remains of a Roman villa.

=== Changing rulers ===
After the death of Mihajlo Višević (910-930), the first known ruler of Zahumlje, Pelješac underwent frequent changes of rulers.

Samuil of Bulgaria (992-1018) ruled Pelješac, then Duklja in 1042, followed by prince Desa of Zahumlje in 1148.

In 1168 Zahumlje and Pelješac came under the rule of prince Miroslav of Zahumlje, brother of Stefan Nemanja of Serbia. He expelled bishop Donat from Ston and Orthodox priests arrived in Pelješac. The Catholic population was then served by the Benedictine monks from the island of Mljet.

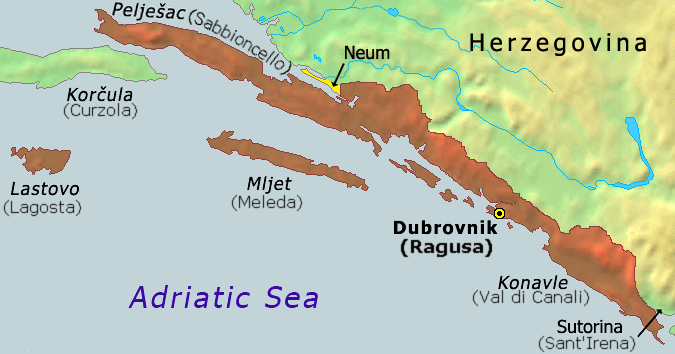
Republic of Ragusa before 1808.

In 1198 Zahumlje recognized the authority of the Hungarian Duke Andrew (1197–1204).

Towards the end of the 13th century the Bribir family came to control the area along with other Dalmatian lands, ruling over more land than any other national ruler before them. In 1322, when Mladen II Bribirski disappeared from politics, the territory of was taken over by the Serbian Branivojevic brothers. They were removed from power by Stephen II of Bosnia with the help of Ragusa in 1326. The Republic of Ragusa (Dubrovnik) initiated diplomatic action to gain international recognition of the newly occupied lands. This was achieved in 1333, with the assistance of the Serbian king Dušan and the Bosnian king Stjepan II Kotromanić. Ragusa also allied with the Hungarian king Louis the Great to ward off any other pretenders to the area. Pelješac remained in the political sphere of the Republic of Ragusa until its fall.

=== Under Ragusa ===
The Republic nobility divided the land among each other and passed laws stating that no one may own land on Pelješac unless he was a citizen of Ragusa, and no one may reside or work there unless he was a serf of the Republic. As a result, all inhabitants automatically became serfs. The serfs of the Republic, although having quite a few obligations, had the right to sail (in the Dubrovnik merchant fleet), be educated, do business and accumulate possessions. In contrast with the other two local superpowers which could have claimed the area, (Venice and the Ottoman Empire), the serfs were acquainted with their local lords and could communicate with them in Croatian. Hence the Republic enjoyed overwhelming support among the population.

In order to have the right to live in a house, every serf family with at least one male member over 16 years of age, had to perform services. Those included working the land for free, transporting the lord by rowing boat and carrying out other orders. The number of days that these services had to be performed varied until the Dubrovnik Senate in 1800 set it at 90 days a year. If a serf household had a garden they had to give the lord a lamb, 2 chickens, 2 chicks and 10 eggs. The price for the grazing of the public land was a dried pig's head. Serf daughters were sent to work as maids in noble families, thus bringing culture and fashion trends from the city to the countryside. Public schools started operating quite early in the Republic, since navigation and sailing required literacy.

Brotherhoods, which in the 13th century had a religious character, received a semi-legal status by the 15th century, and held responsibilities such as collecting port fees. Fishing brotherhoods, such as the one dedicated to St. Peter, always took a fisherman apostle as a patron saint.

Until 1343, when the captaincy was established in Orebić, the seat of authority for Peljesac was in Ston. From 1456 Trpanj had been administered by the newly established captaincy in Janjina. However, since Trpanj was on the coast, unlike Janjina, the Janjina captain spent most of his time in Trpanj, despite the fact that Janjina was more populous.

=== Lords of Trpanj ===
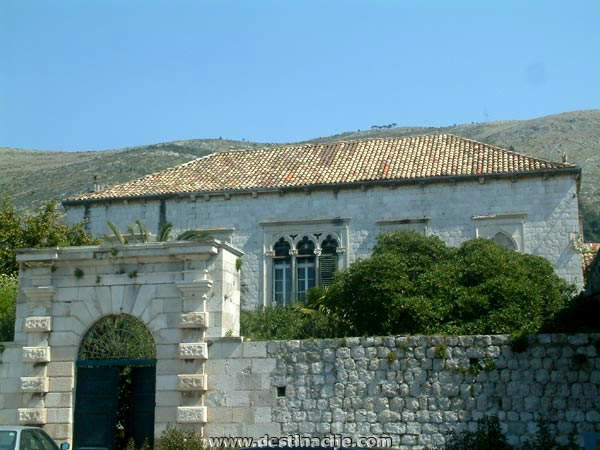
The Ghetaldi-Gondola house

When Ragusan nobility divided Pelješac among each other in 1344, Trpanj was sectioned into 4 parts: two and a half were given to the brothers Dobre and Luka from the Gambe family and the brothers Marko and Petar from the Bucchia family received one and a half. Both of these families were in the maritime commerce business. In 1352 when Dobre Gambe died, his part went to his brother Luka and in turn when Luka died in 1358 he requested that his part be sold and the proceeds be given to the monastery in Ston. The Bucchia brothers also had no inheritors and their parts were sold at public auction in 1395 for 1501 perpers. Trpanj became property of the Gradi family. The exact date is not known but it must have been before 24 February 1498, since a building contract with that date describes the construction of a stone house in Trpanj for Stjepan Gradi. Biagio Stefano Gradi left Trpanj to his son-in-law Jerolim Frano Gundulić. Hence the Gondola family came into possession of Trpanj on 16 November 1615. Due to a court order from 18 February 1626 the brothers i, Stefan and Frano Gundulić were ordered to return the dowry of their grandmother to her brothers Miho and Ivan Resti. To raise the money, the brothers sold half of their Trpanj possessions to Ivan Krste Benessa on 17 July 1632 for 1,590 ducats, stipulating that if in 8 years they manage to return that sum of money to the buyer, the sale will be annulled, which probably happened as Trpanj remained in the Gondola family. When his brothers died, Biagio found himself sole proprietor of Trpanj, and in order to ensure that Trpanj as a whole remained in his family he made Trpanj an indivisible legal entity protected by a “fideicomis”, a sort of a testamentary trust.

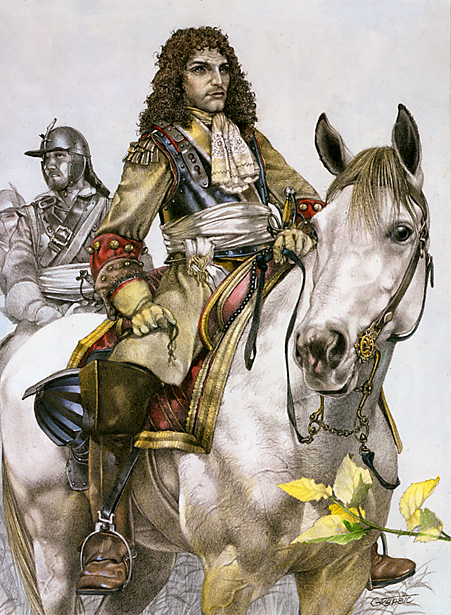
Frano Gundulić-Gondola (1683).

Frano Gondola, who was an Austrian marshal, wrote from Vienna on 22 May 1672 to his friend Marco Bassegli to ask him to get the Republic to name him Duke and as a result to name Trpanj Dukedom of St. Michael of Trpanj. This was necessary because of his position in Vienna. Frano died in 1700 before being able to build a summer residence in Trpanj. Francesco Gondola left the residence in Trpanj to his son Francesco II, who died in Vienna in 1717, without male offspring.

In the spring of 1700 the Gondola family was sued in court by Slava, wife of Paolo Gozze, and the court ordered Trpanj to be divided in two. Although court documents clearly divide the land and property, the court order was never carried out and the town remained the Gondola fideicomis. Sigismondo was sued again, this time by his serfs from Trpanj, in the spring of 1741, for a variety of unlawful actions ranging from requiring free fishing to confiscation of boats and other property and interference in their commerce.

Sigismondo (*1682) died in 1758 leaving Trpanj to his son Sigismondo Domenico Gondola (1712–1800). In order to avoid constant lawsuits by his financially powerful serfs, he struck a deal on 4 July 1765 whereby the 70 Trpanj families were to pay a sum of money for the following 25 years, instead of performing services or giving gifts to Gundulić. Only the gift of olive oil still had to be delivered to the landlord. The sum of money had to be paid by each family before the celebration of St. Michael's. That contract was signed a second time for another period of 25 years when the first one expired.

Sigismondo Domenico Gondola, who was to die in 1800, had no inheritors so he adopted his sister's (Katarina) son Frano Agostino Ghetaldi in 1787. In 1807, the last Count Gondola, Sigismondo Domenico, litigated in the courts of Dubrovnik the fideicomis instituted by Biagio Gondola in 1649 by Pietro Ignazio Gio. Sorgo-Cerva and Bernardo Caboga by the possession of Trpanj against Sigismondo Ghetaldi-Gondola.

But finally he was succeeded by the sons of Frano Agostino Ghetaldi and Catterina Gondola, Frano Ghetaldi and his sons: Sigismondo Ghetaldi-Gondola (1795–1860) and Mateo Ghetaldi-Gondola (born in 1797), and Trpanj was left to Sigismondo who was later named Baron and podestà of Ragusa for 13 years. He had 3 children: Frano, Gino (1835–1891) and Maria (born 1837). Trpanj remained the property of the Ghetaldi-Gondola family and its inhabitants would pay the landlord a fixed sum of money every year instead of the traditional services and gifts in nature until the Trpanj residents, the first on Pelješac, decided to legally buy their town from the landlord and relieve themselves of official serfdom in 1856.

== Demographics ==
According to the 2001 census, Trpanj had a population of 871. Croats make up 93.11% of the population.

In 2021, the municipality had 683 residents in the following settlements:

- Donja Vrućica, population 23
- Duba Pelješka, population 29
- Gornja Vrućica, population 37
- Trpanj, population 594
Trpanj: Population trends 1857–2021
v

population	1427	1450	1474	1476	1318	1275	1305	1281	1115	1151	1203	1090	1047	871	871	721	683
	1857	1869	1880	1890	1900	1910	1921	1931	1948	1953	1961	1971	1981	1991	2001	2011	2021

Sources: Croatian Bureau of Statistics publications

== Notable people ==
- Ena Begović, actress (1960–2000)
- Mia Begović, actress
- Stjepan Ivanišević, Minister of Justice: 2001–2003

== See also ==
- House of Gundulić
