= Tears of the Prodigal Son =

1622 poem by Ivan Gundulić

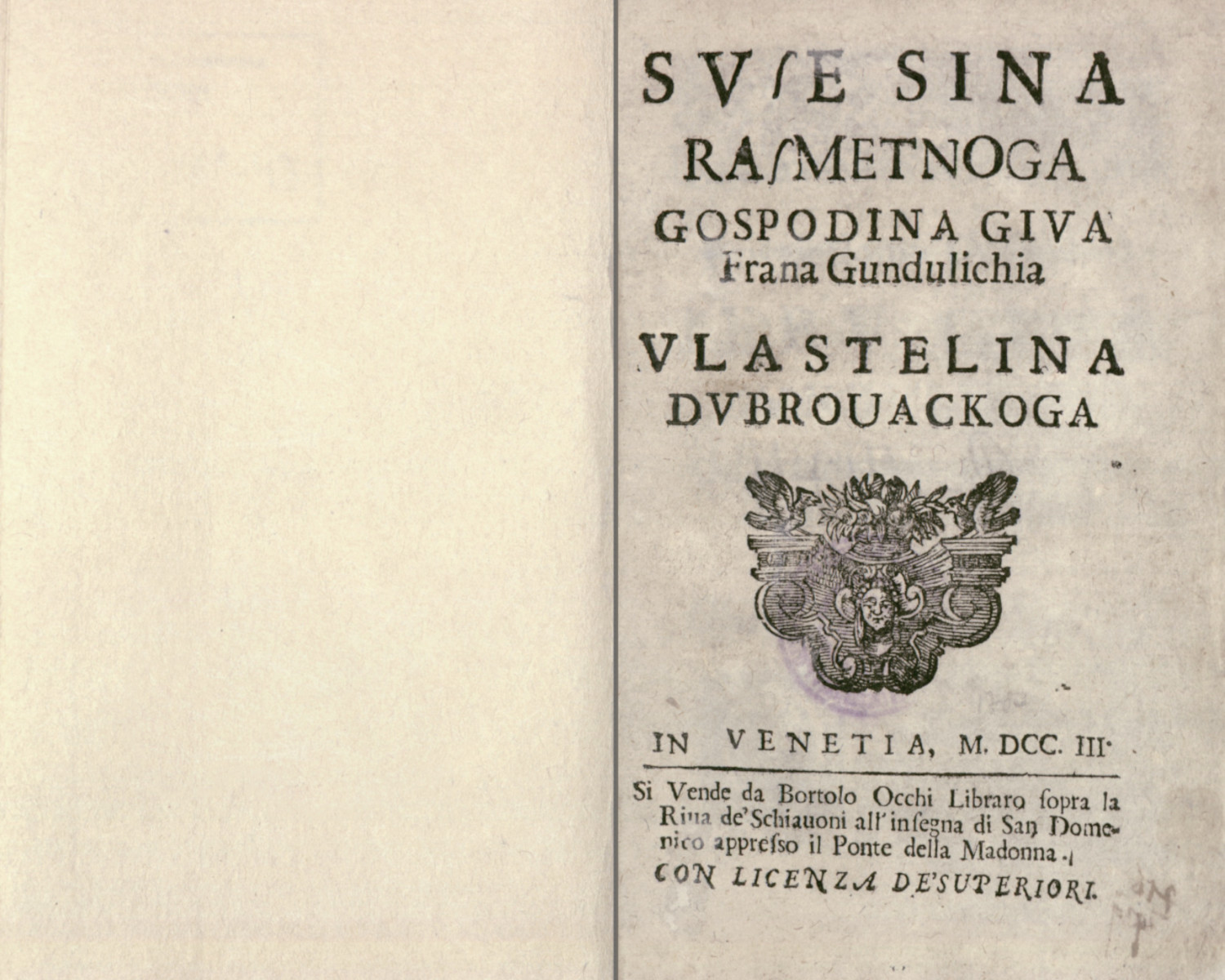
Tears of the Prodigal Son, title page (1703 reprint)

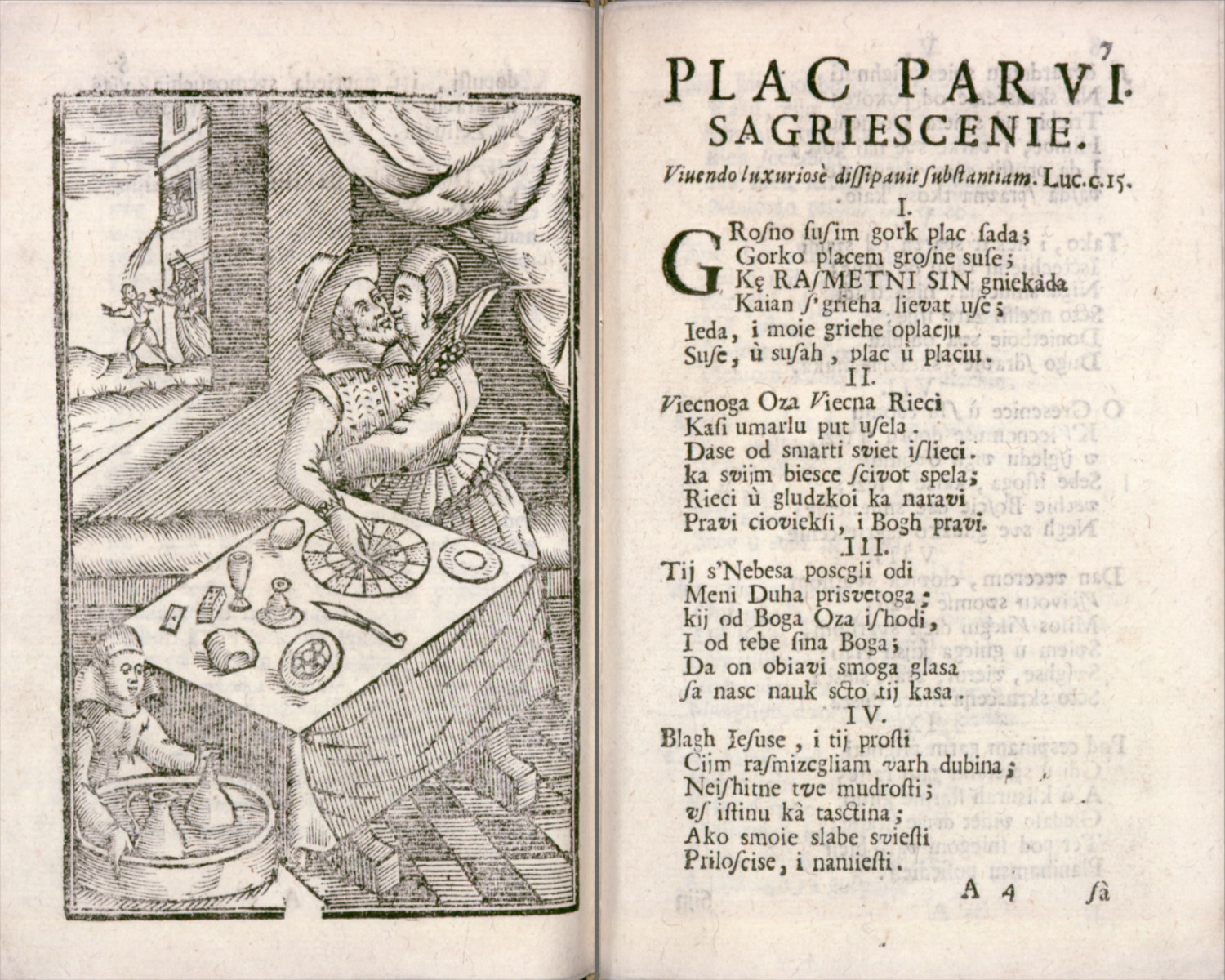
Plač prvi: Sagriescenie

The Tears of the Prodigal Son (Croatian: Suze sina razmetnoga) is a poem written by the Croatian Baroque poet Ivan Gundulić. It was originally published in Venice in 1622.

The poem is composed of three laments (cries) (plač): the Sin (Sagriješenje), the Comprehension (Spoznanje) and the Humility (Skrušenje), presenting the three basic categories of Christianity—sin, repentance and redemption—through contrasts like death/life, sin/purity and Hell/Heaven.

== Biblical basis ==
The poem Tears of the Prodigal Son draws on the well-known biblical Parable of the Prodigal Son found in Luke 15:11–32, the basis of which forms a story on a father forgiving his son's spendthriftness and greed, after the son comes back home remorseful of his actions. Gundulić adapts and heavily elaborates the original storyline, but still leaves clearly recognizable traits of the biblical template.

Parable as a literary form represents an elaborated simile or a metaphor, inserted into a larger literary works—the Bible in this case. Biblical parable on the prodigal son has but merely two dozen lines, while Gundulić's poetical cultivation extends to 1332 verses, being permeated with numerous son's contemplations on the meaning of life and death, the sin, and numerous verses dedicated to his repentance.

In monologue form the son introduces the plot to the reader, and therefore beside being the main character serves also the role of a narrator, with the exception of sporadic occurrence of the omniscient narrator who announces the monologue. In the biblical parable, however, only the omniscient narrator appears.

Significantly different is the elaboration on the sin itself, being portrayed in the biblical parable as a hedonistic enjoyment in life's pleasures, excessive luxury and overindulgence. The poem adapts those sins too, but ultimately binds them into the foremost sin of lust, induced by a beautiful woman. Lust has encouraged the son to prodigality, for his fortunes fade not for his own self-centered "riotous living", but for the sake of pleasing the woman by buying her valuable presents. The character of a salacious woman is non-existent in the biblical parable, and as a counterbalance the poem omits the character of an older son which slightly changes the poem's ending and significantly the moral lesson learned.

Both the parable and the poem elaborate on the problem of sin, insight into it, and finally on repentance and forgiveness. But, while the biblical parable is directed towards the "righteous" which are advised that every sinner's conversion should be celebrated "for this thy brother was dead, and is alive again; and was lost, and is found" (Luke 15:32, KJV), the poem focuses on the sinner itself, emphasizing that everyone who experiences genuine repentance will be forgiven, and his eternity secured.

== Form ==
Gundulić's Tears of the Prodigal Son is a religious poem structured in three laments. Every lament is prefaced by a convenient quote from the Gospel of Luke whence the plot itself is adopted from. Laments are titled in accordance with the three stages the prodigal son experiences: the Sin, the Comprehension and the Humility.

The very beginning of the poem is marked by a brief dedication in prose to the Prisvijetlomu gospodinu Jeru Dživa Gundulića ("the lustrous sire Jeru Dživa Gundulića"), formally separated from laments, in which the author looks back to the glorious tradition of Dubrovnik's poetry and briefly announces poem's subject.

The poem is written in symmetric octosyllables combined to sestinas, with the first lament having 74, the second 56 and the third 92 octosyllabic sestinas, with rhyme scheme ABABCC.

== Style ==
Poem as a term even in the ancient Greco-Roman literature had a more general notion of literary form, which is probably one of the reasons why it remained undetermined by today, embodying the characteristics of all three literary arts: lyrics, epics and drama. Elaborate plot, characters and the narrator are traits of epic poetry, drama is manifested by an extremely intensive internal conflict of the main character and the long monologues, and lyrics is indicated in the form itself, by the emotional vigour, ethical and theological contemplations and numerous poetical devices and figures of speech such as similes, epithets, strong metaphors and numerous contradictory figures—oxymorons, paradoxes and antitheses. The antithesis of "sin/purification" imbues the piece as a whole, so the poem itself can be understood as one big antithesis. Also, it's marked by the prevalent allegory, for the plot on the relationship between the father and the son can be transferred to the relationship of a man and God.

== See also ==
- 1622 in poetry

== Bibliography ==
- Suze sina razmetnoga; Venice, 1622, 1623.
- Suse sina rasmetnoga, Sedam pjesnji pokornieh; Pjesan od velicjanstvaa Boscieh / Giva Frana Gundulichja vlastelina dubrovackoga; Od prie drugovdje, napokon ovdi pritjesctene; po Antunu Maretkini, Dubrovnik, 1828.
- Dubravka; Suze sina razmetnoga / Gjivo Frana Gundulića, published by D. Pretnera, Dubrovnik, 1909.
- Ivan Gundulić: Dubravka / Suze sina razmetnoga; edited and with foreword written by Albert Haller, Zagreb, 1944.
- Ivan Gundulić: Suze sina razmetnoga / Dubravka / Ferninandu od Toskane; edition Pet stoljeća hrvatske književnosti, book 12, edited by Jakša Ravlić, Zagreb, 1964.
- Ivan Gundulić: Suze sina razmetnoga / Dubravka; edited by Franjo Švelec, Zagreb, 1974, ^{2}1976.
- Ivan Gundulić: Suze sina razmetnoga / Dubravka; edited by Franjo Švelec, foreword by Lahorka Plejić, Zagreb, 1996.
- Ivan Gundulić: Suze sina razmetnoga / Dubravka; edited by Franjo Švalec, foreword and appendix by Dean Duda, Zagreb, 2001.
- Ivan Gundulić: Suze sina razmetnoga / Dubravka; edited by Fališevac, methodically arranged by Majda Bekić-Vejzović, Zagreb, 1993, ^{2}1999, ^{3}2005.
