= Boris Papandopulo =

Croatian composer

- Born: 25 February 1906; Honnef am Rhein, German Empire
- Died: 16 October 1991 (aged 85); Zagreb, Croatia
- Era: 20th century
- Works: http://quercus.mic.hr/quercus/person/339

Boris Papandopulo (February 25, 1906 – October 16, 1991) was a Croatian composer and conductor of Greek and Russian Jewish descent. He was the son of Greek nobleman Konstantin Papandopulo and Croatian opera singer Maja Strozzi-Pečić and one of the most distinctive Croatian musicians of the 20th century. Papandopulo also worked as a music writer, journalist, reviewer, pianist and piano accompanist; however, he achieved the peaks of his career in music as a composer. His composing oeuvre is imposing (counting c. 460 works): with great success he created instrumental (orchestral, concertante, chamber and solo), vocal and instrumental (for solo voice and choir), stage music and film music. In all these kinds and genres he left a string of anthology-piece compositions of great artistic value.

== Biography ==
"Born, growing up and being brought up in a family that had always been tightly connected with music and the theatre", he devoted himself to music very early on. He first of all took private lessons in piano, and then studied composition at the Music Academy in Zagreb (where he attended the lectures of Dugan, Lhotka and Dobronić, and studied composition in and graduated from the class of Blagoje Bersa in 1929). In Vienna, at the New Vienna Conservatory, he studied conducting under Dirk Fock (1928–1930). During two periods (1928–1934 and 1938–1946) he was a conductor of the Croatian Singing Association called Kolo, Zagreb, and from 1931 to 1934 had posts of conductor of the Society Orchestra of the Croatian Music Institute and choirmaster of the "Ivan Filipović" Teachers' Singing Association (which he himself founded in 1933). From 1935 to 1938, he worked as a teacher at the State Music School in Split, and was conductor of the Zvonimir Music Association, as well as, from 1940 to 1945, of the Zagreb Opera (from 1943 to 1945 he was its director). At the same time he was a conductor of the orchestra of Radio Zagreb (1942–1945). After World War II he was a director of the Rijeka Opera (1946–1948 and 1953–1959), while, from 1948 to 1953 he was an opera conductor and a teacher in Sarajevo. He took up his career in Zagreb again as a conductor of the Zagreb Opera (1959–1968) and then the Split Opera (1968–1974). He was a regular guest-conductor of the Komedija Theatre in Zagreb, as well as of the Cairo Symphony Orchestra.

== Oeuvre ==
Papandopulo's music combines elements of Croatian folk traditions with broader European influences. His works often use clear, neo-Classical structures, energetic Baroque-style rhythms, and occasional hints of Impressionism and Expressionism. Although his writing can be technically demanding for performers, his music is generally marked by a sense of optimism and calm.

Listeners and scholars often point to several standout works from his early period: Laudamus (Slavoslovije), a cantata for soloists, mixed choir and orchestra; the Sinfonietta for string orchestra; Zlato / Gold, a mime ballet with singing and orchestra; and the lively Concerto da camera for solo soprano, violin and seven wind instruments.

He also wrote two important Croatian sacred works during this time: the oratorio Muka Gospodina našega Isukrsta (The Passion of Our Lord Jesus Christ) for soloists and male a cappella choir, and Hrvatska misa (Croatian Mass) for soloists and mixed a cappella choir.

In his mature creative period, Papandopulo retains elements of folk music idiom, but also addresses the achievements of the European musical Moderne, without "departing from the traditional formants of musical cells, from the settled development of motif and facture or the well-established laws of melodic movement." This period, revolving around the temporal axis of the end of World War II (1945), lasted until about 1956, and gave rise to a number of very successful compositions marked by recent history – the creation of the new state and events from the National Liberation War (Symphony No. 2, Poema o Neretvi / Poem about the Neretva, Stojanka majka Knežopoljka / Stojanka, A Knežopolje Mother, a musical poem for soprano solo, choir and large orchestra, Obnova / Reconstruction, a symphonic movement for large orchestra).

In time his music became more dissonant, rougher in harmony and melody. In the mid-1950s he integrated into his composing technical arsenal elements of dodecaphony, jazz (most vigorously in the late fifties and early sixties; Concerto for Piano and Orchestra No 3, Mosaic for Classical String Quartet and Jazz Quartet, Capriccio for Violin Solo and Jazz Quartet, Ein Orchestermosaik and so on). Later, pop came in, as did other technical composition techniques of the avant-garde in music of the 20th century, although he retained an ironical distance from some of them, subjecting them on occasions to irony or parody. The origin of part of Papandopulo's oeuvre of the 1960s and 1970s is related to his guest appearances and acquaintanceships with musicians in the then divided Germany (FRG and GDR), where he had opportunities to meet outstanding artistic personalities, as well as recent European musical creation.

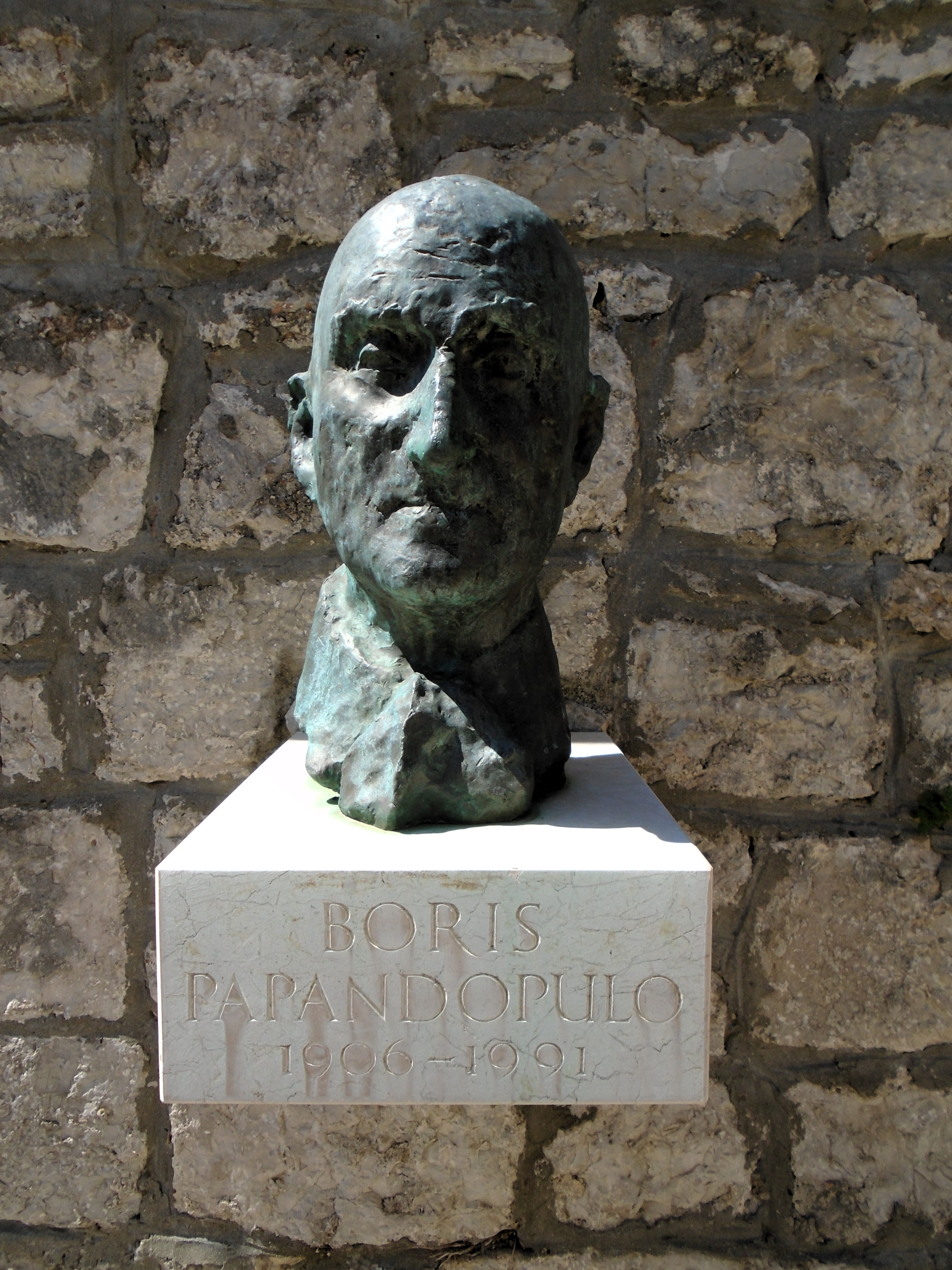
Boris Papandopulo bust in Osor, island of Krk

Ideologically grounded aesthetic worldviews never inhibited Papandopulo in his choice of non-musical subjects for his own works; he always found, in each one of them, universal ideas, profound human values. At the beginning of this work he found non-musical stimuli in topics related to the older strata of the folk tradition – in "legends, rites and myths" (Svatovske / Bridal, Dodolice, a Folk Ritual for the Solo Soprano, Piano and Girl's Choir Op 2, Zlato / Gold, Utva zlatokrila / Ruddy Shellduck). Later, after 1950, very curiously, he drew his inspiration from apparently diametrically opposed worldviews. At the same time he would write compositions of religious topics – from the Croatian Catholic mass with traces and elements of Glagolitic chant (Osorski rekvijem / Osor Requiem, Pučka poljička misa / Folk Mass from Poljica, the cantata Jubilate and a number of smaller religious works) and also monumental works of socialist realism (inspired by the ideology and poetics of the post-war socialist revolution and the People's Liberation War, such as the musical-poetical work Pasija po srcu / Passion After the Heart, the poetic-musical vision Credo, 1943 – cycle of songs to words by Ivan Goran Kovačić) as well as those inspired by Croatian history (the cantatas Libertas, Pohvala Dubrovniku / In Praise of Dubrovnik, Non bene pro toto libertas venditur auro, Mile Gojslavica and the triptych for mixed voice choir and large symphony orchestra Istarske freske / Istrian Frescos and so on).

Papandopulo composed almost to the day of his death. In all these works he showed himself a master of his craft. As well as a number of concerts and solo works for individual instruments Papandopulo left a marked trace on the ballet and opera of his time. His six operas and 15 ballets have demonstrated their anthological values in the many repeated performances at home and around the world. He composed music for an impressive number of stage productions and films, and also devoted some of his opuses for children and young people (puppet performances, instrumental compositions and instrumental concerti).

A large number of his works feature an authentic and Papandopulo buoyant musical humour (in a large range from tonal play full of brightness to flippancy and rough musical grotesquery) in which he often quotes themes of other authors (Grotesque for Tuba, Piano and Percussion, Pop Concerto for Two Pianos and Orchestra, Magic Flute, Papandopulijada, Divertimento alla pasticcio and so on). The composer Dubravko Detoni described Papandopulo's work as follows: "If it were necessary to utter some kind of definition, then a summation of Papandopulo's oeuvre should be sought in its being some kind of synthesis of all the more important modern influences from world music in combination with rhythmical, melodic and harmonic features of the Croatian folk melody." Irrespective of the time of composition or the stylistic or musical expressive orientation, Papandopulo's "music very easily and spontaneously makes direct contact with the listener", and musicians are glad to play it.

Boris Papandopulo played an important role as an arranger of folk songs from the wider region (Central Europe) and as populariser and arranger of works of other composers. This particularly refers to anthological compositions of Croatian concertante and operatic music, some of which he revitalised and put on the stage in his own arrangement (some of the works of Lisinski, Zajc and Krežma, for example).

== Selected works ==
=== Opera ===
- Sunčanica
- Amfitrion
- Rona

=== Ballet ===
- Zlato
- Teuta
- Kraljevo

=== Orchestra ===
- Hommage à Bach (1972)
- Sinfonietta for String Orchestra, Op. 79
- Istarske freske
- Podnevna simfonija

=== Concertante ===
- Concerto da Camera for Soprano (Vocalise) and Chamber Ensemble, Op.11 (published 1941)
- Concerto for Violin and Orchestra (1943)
- Concerto for Double Bass and String Orchestra (1968)
- Concerto for Harpsichord and String Orchestra (1962)
- Percussion Concerto (1969)
- Concerto for Piano and String Orchestra
- Concerto for Piano and Orchestra No. 3 (1959)
- Concerto for Timpani and Orchestra
- Concerto for Alto Saxophone and Orchestra
- Little Concerto for Piccolo and String Orchestra (1977)

=== Chamber / instrumental ===
- Clarinet Quintet (1960)
- Dialogue for Flute and Harpsichord
- Elegie for Bassoon and Piano
- Introduzione, Ariosa, Danza for Cello and Piano
- Kleine Suite for 4 Trombones (1981)
- Monolog for Violin Solo
- Rhapsody for Cello Solo (1987)
- Sonata for Viola and Piano (1963)
- Sonata for Violin and Piano
- String Quartet No. 5 (1970)
- Three Yugoslavian Dances for Guitar
- Rapsodia Concertante for Cello and Piano

=== Keyboard ===
- Contradanza for Piano
- Hrvatski tanac (Croatian Dance) for Piano, Op.48
- Osam studija (8 Etudes) for Piano
- Partita for Piano
- Passacaglia for Organ
- Scherzo Fantastico for Piano

=== Vocal ===
- Čakavska Suita for (High) Voice and Orchestra
- Hrvatska Misa (Croatian Mass) in D Minor for Soprano, Alto, Tenor and Baritone Soloists and Mixed Chorus, Op.86 (1939)
- Muka gospodina našega isukrsta , Oratorio for Soloists and Male Chorus a Cappella, Op.61
- Marulova pisan
- Osorski Requiem
- Five Orchestral Songs for Baritone, String Orchestra, and Harp (1961)
- Stojanka majka Knežopoljka for Soprano, Chorus and Orchestra

== Legacy ==
Boris Papandopulo is held in high esteem in his native country.

The "Papandopulo" Croatian Competition of young musicians is named for Boris Papandopulo. It is hosted in the small hall of the Vatroslav Lisinski Concert Hall annually in January. The competition was founded in 2012 and 2026 saw the 14th edition of the competition.
