= Gundulić family =

Ragusan noble family

Gundulić Gondola
- Country: Republic of Ragusa; Austria-Hungary
- Founded: 930
- Titles: Count
- Dissolution: 1800
- Cadet branches: House of Getaldić-Gundulić

The House of Gundulić (known in Italian as Gondola) was a noble family of the Republic of Ragusa, considered one of the most prestigious families of the republic. It had origins in southern Dalmatia and Tyrol. The family's motto is Tout ou rien ("All or nothing").

== Origin ==
According to historian Serafin Cerva, the Gundulić patriciate dates to 930, as does those of Gozze, Pozza and Giorgi, meaning that they were deemed the oldest ones of Ragusa. The first known member of the Gundulić family was known as Silvanus. The mention of the name comes from 1024. The name Gundulić derives from Venetan góndoƚa, possibly from Byzantine Greek κοντοῦρα (“cutter, kind of ship”).

== Middle Ages ==
In the 13th century, three generations of this family took leading roles in the public life in Ragusa. In the 15th century, Paladino Gundulić held the important position of a diplomat of the Republic to the Kingdom of Naples and Skanderbeg. Ivan Đivo Gundulić was the Ragusan ambasador to the Bosnian court in Sutjeska. In August 1415, he attended the stanak (assembly) in Sutjeska alongside Bosnian King Ostoja and all the major noblemen. Following the assembly, Gundulić witnessed and later documented the assassination of Pavle Radinović, which was carried out by the king's and Sandalj Hranić's men.

== 17th century ==
The poet Ivan Gundulić (1589-1638) became the most significant person in the Gundulić family, being named the Count of Konavle in 1615 and 1619. In 1634 he became a senator. At the end of 1638 he was elected to the Small Council, but died before taking office. Ivan married Nicoletta Sorkočević, daughter of Sigmund Sorkočević.

Ivan's son, Frano, served the Austrian Empire and the Polish King Jan III Sobieski in 1683, participating in the defeat of the Ottoman Turks at the Battle of Vienna. The family then obtained fiefdoms from Emperor Leopold I. The other sons, Sigmund and Matteo, spent several years in the military service of the Spanish Habsburgs. After his return to Dubrovnik, Mateo lived in Turkey for 28 months, until 1674. Matteo later married a commoner, but had no children. He was elected the Rector of Ragusa many times.

On 20 April 1693 the Secretary of the Republic of Ragusa, Michael Allegrettus, confirmed the nobility of the family on behalf of the Rectors and the Great Council (Consilium Maius), its patrician status.

== Gallery ==
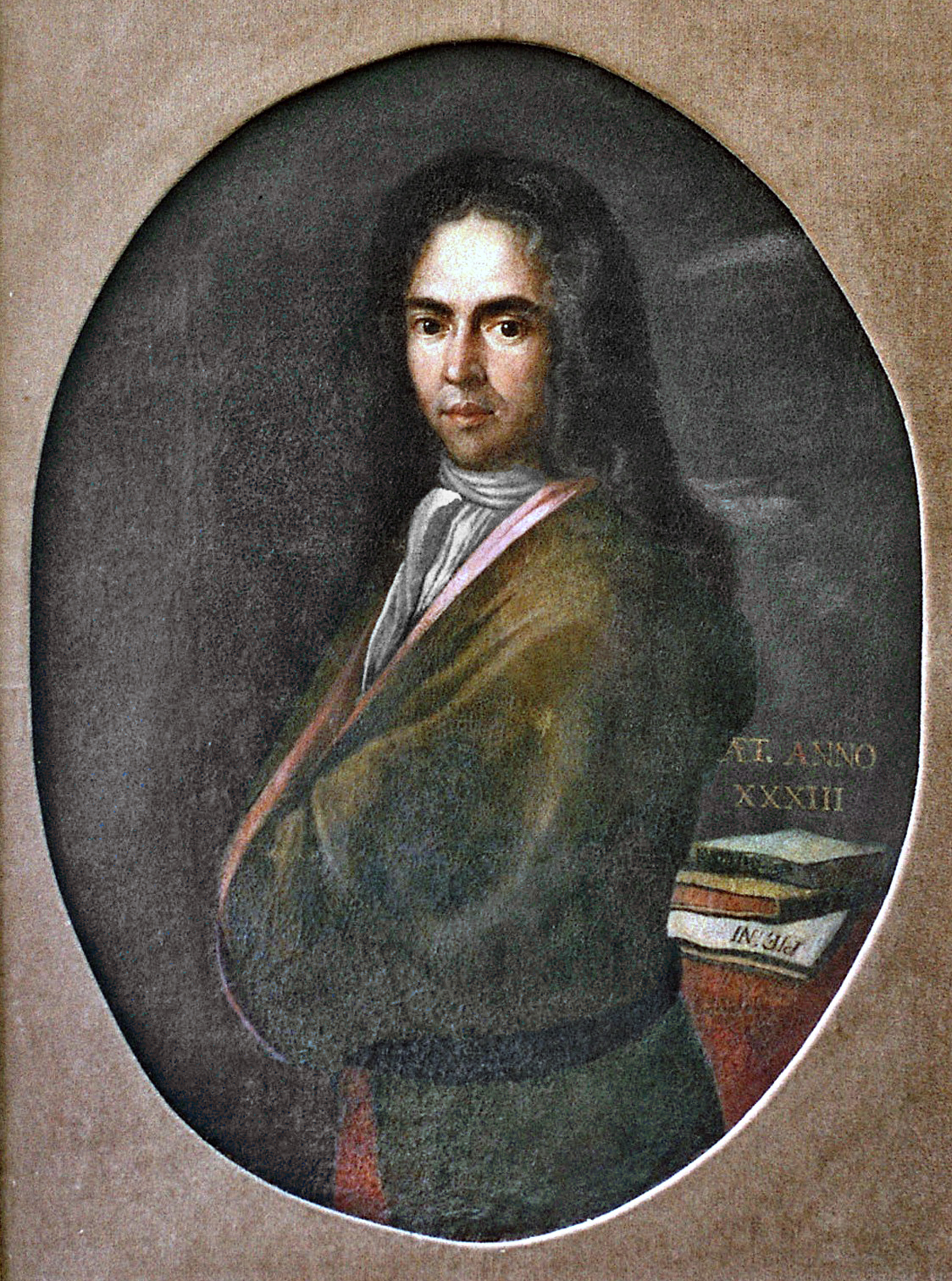
Ivan Gundulić "Đivo" (1589–1638)

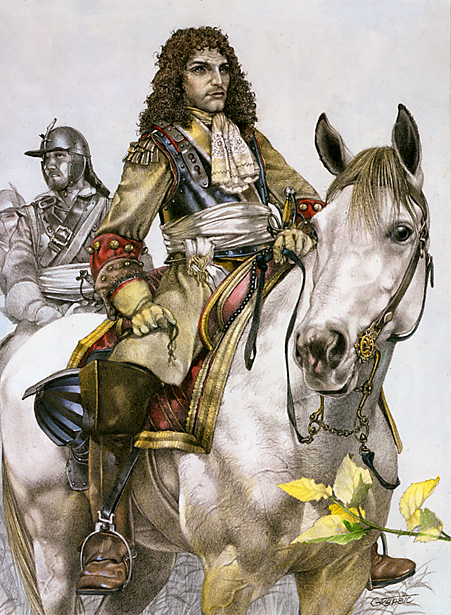
Fran Điva Gundulić (1630-1700)

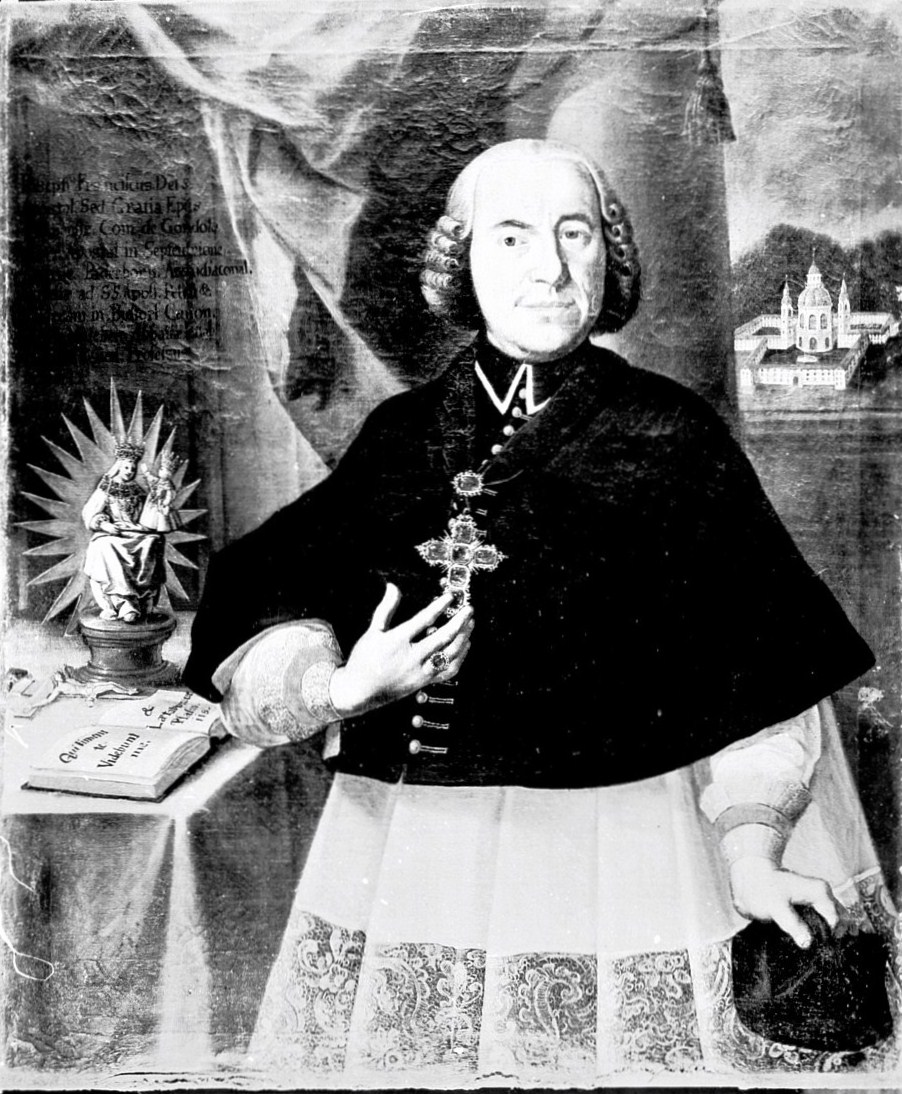
Frano Josip Gondola, OSB (1711–1774), Titular Bishop of Tempe

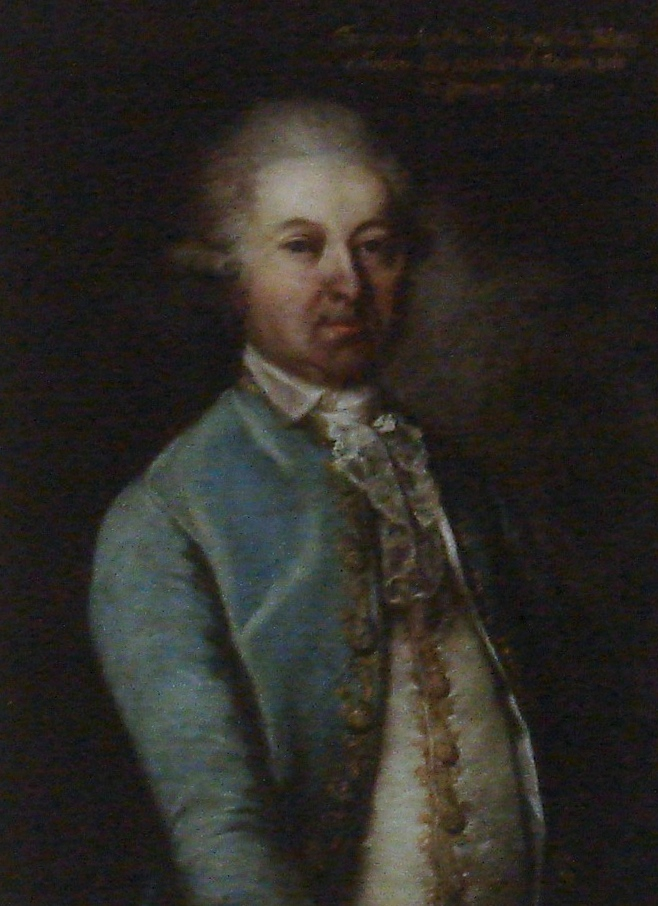
Frano Agostino Ghetaldi-Gondola

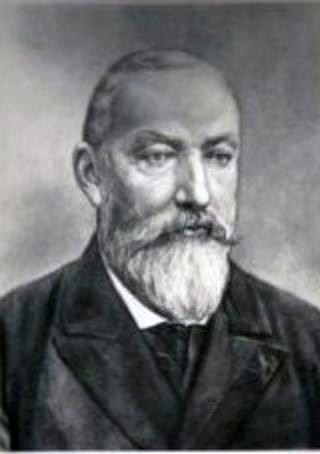
Frano Ghetaldi-Gondola (1833-1899), mayor of Dubrovnik

Ghetaldi-Gondola Memorial Lapad Cemetery

== See also ==
- Ivan Đivo Gundulić (fl. around 1415), merchant and Ragusan diplomat at the Bosnian Court, known for witnessing and describing events surrounding Pavle Radinović's assassination
- Paladino Gondola (fl. 1423–72), diplomat and merchant
- Trojan Gundulić
- Ivan Gundulić
- Fran Đivo Gundulić
- Šišmundo Gundulić
- Dživo Šiškov Gundulić
- Frano Getaldić-Gundulić

== Annotations ==
1. Usage of the name "Gondola" in English-language sources.
  Selected examples:
  - David Rheubottom (2000), pages 4, 21, 33, 62
  - John Thomas (2009), page 1055
  - Dubrovnik Annals (2007), pages 42 and 63
  - Virginia Cox (2011), pp. 216, 238 and 261
  Usage of the name "Gundulić" in English-language sources.
  Selected examples:
  - Harris (2006), p.296
  - Goy (2001), p.28
  - Rossiter (1969), p.159
  - Hochman (1984), p.434
  - Sugar (1993), p.181
  - Cvitanic (2011), p.112
