= Frano Getaldić-Gundulić =

Frano Ghetaldi-Gundulić

Mayor of Dubrovnik
- In office 1890–1899
- Preceded by: Vlaho de Giulli
- Succeeded by: Pero Čingrija

Personal details
- Born: August 8, 1833 Dubrovnik, Dalmatia, Austrian Empire (now Croatia)
- Died: July 3, 1899 (aged 65) Dubrovnik, Dalmatia, Austria-Hungary (now Croatia)
- Occupation: politician

Baron Francesco Ghetaldi-Gondola or Frano Getaldić-Gundulić (August 8, 1833 - July 3, 1899), was a Ragusan writer and politician, the first son of Sigismondo Ghetaldi-Gondola and Malvina Ursula de Bosdari. Francesco was a member of the Knights of St. John from 1889 until the death of the Mayor of Dubrovnik. He was decorated with the Cross of Devotion (S.M.O) on June 15, 1857. He fought in the Franco-Prussian War (1870–1871). Francesco founded the Philatelic Society in Dubrovnik on December 4, 1890.

== Biography ==
Baron Gondola was a improving landlord and horticulturist of Lapad, introduced in the second half of the XIX century the brussels sprouts, blue cabbage, oil, grapes and other vegetables, later he founded an Agronomy school in Lapad, Gruž. Francesco was the first to install in the old city electrical energy to light the streets; and was in 1894 who gave permission for Hotel Imperial's construction and thus to begin the policy of promoting tourism, which lasts until today.

He wrote to the Times magazine, asking for further help for the refugees; his letter appeared on 12 April 1875. More than 150,000 people took refuge in Austro-Hungary in 1875 due to the Herzegovinian rebellion.

In 1889 the Serb political circle in Dubrovnik supported baron Francesco Gondola, the candidate of the Autonomist Party (Dalmatians who were pro-Italian), in the 1890 election to the Parliament of Dalmatia, against the candidate of the People's Party (Dalmatians who were pro-Croatian). In the following year during the election of the local government, the Autonomous Party with the Serb Party won the municipal election in Dubrovnik. Francesco was re-elected as the municipal chief in 1894 after a tumultuous election. He was affiliated with the Serb Catholic movement in 19th-century Dubrovnik and belonged to the pro-Italian Autonomist Party, but he himself wrote that he "wasn't Croatian, Serbian or Italian in his ethnic affiliation, rather a Ragusan (Raguseo)".

In 1893 he opened the monument for Ivan Gundulić in Gundulić Square during the politically controversial unveiling of the Gundulić monument. Francesco lived with his sister Maria (Foehr-Ferry 1837-1908) in the Villa Gondola.

Francesco committed suicide in 1899, one day after delivering the account of the treasury of the municipality. The political opponents sabotaged their local government, stole 10,000 florins from the local treasury.

He was buried in the St. Mihajlo family cemetery in Lapad (in the Gruž district).

Political offices
Preceded by Vlaho de Giulli	Mayor of Dubrovnik; 1890-1899	Succeeded by Pero Čingrija

== See also ==
- House of Gundulić
- Republic of Ragusa
