= Ivan Gundulić =

Poet from Ragusa, in modern Croatia (1589–1638)

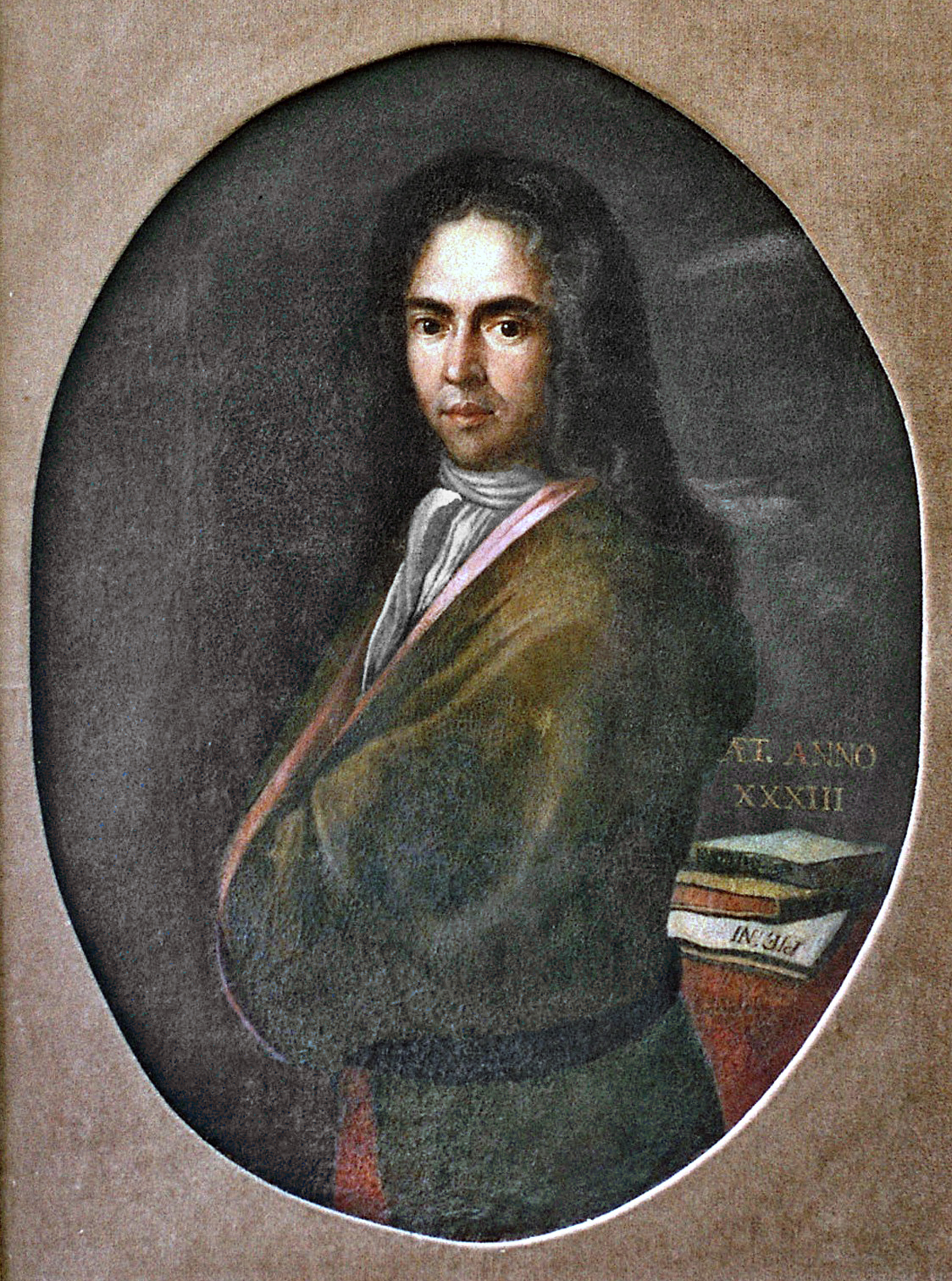
- Born: Dživo Franov Gundulić; 8 January 1589; Dubrovnik, Republic of Ragusa (modern Croatia)
- Died: December 8, 1638 (aged 49); Dubrovnik, Republic of Ragusa (modern Croatia)
- Citizenship: Republic of Ragusa
- Occupation: Poet
- Relatives: Gundulić family
- Writing career
- Pen name: Ivan Gundulić (from 19th century on)
- Period: Baroque
- Notable works: Tears of the Prodigal Son; Dubravka; Osman

Dživo Franov Gundulić (Italian: Gianfrancesco Gondola; 8 January 1589 – 8 December 1638), better known today as Ivan Gundulić, was the most prominent Ragusan Baroque. He is regarded as the Croatian national poet. His work embodies central characteristics of Roman Catholic Counter-Reformation: religious fervor, insistence on "vanity of this world" and zeal in opposition to "infidels". Gundulić's major works—the epic poem Osman, the pastoral play Dubravka, and the religious poem Tears of the Prodigal Son (based on the Parable of the Prodigal Son)—are examples of Baroque stylistic richness and, frequently, rhetorical excess.

== Life and works ==
Gundulić was born in Dubrovnik into a wealthy Ragusan noble family (see House of Gundulić) on 8 January 1589. Son of Francesco di Francesco Gundulić (Frano Franov Gundulić, senator and diplomat, once the Ragusan envoy to Constantinople and councilor of the Republic to the Pope Gregory VIII) and Dživa Gradić (de Gradi). He received an excellent education. He probably studied the humanities with the Jesuit Silvestro Muzio and philosophy with Ridolfo Ricasoli and Camillo Camilli, who in late 1590 had been appointed rettore delle scuole e professore di umane lettere in Ragusa. After that he studied Roman law and jurisprudence in general, where he held numerous offices for the Great Council of the Republic. In 1608, when he was nineteen, he became a member of the Veliko vieće (Great Council). Twice, in 1615 and 1619, he held the temporary function of knez (commissary or governor) of Konavle, an area southeast of the city.

At the age of thirty he married Nicoleta Sorkočević (Sorgo) (died 1644) who bore him three sons, Frano (Francesco), Mato (Matheo), Šišmundo "Šiško" (Segismondo) and two daughters, Marija "Mare" (Maria) Gondola and Dživa (Giovanna). Fran Dživa Gundulić and Mato Gundulić (1636–1684) fought in the thirty-years war under Wallenstein; the youngest died on January 16, 1682, being by then the Rector of the Republic. From 1621 until his death Ivan held various offices in the city government. In 1636 he became a senator, in 1637 a judge, and in 1638 a member of the Small Council (Malo vieće). Had he lived a little longer – he died of an intense fever, product of an inflammation in his ribs ( Folio 15 Libr. Mort. N°274, Adi le Xbre 1638 Ragusa) – he would probably have been elected knez (rector) of the Dubrovnik Republic, the highest function that was held for one month only by meritorious gentlemen at least fifty years old. His father, who died in 1624, had been knez five times, and Ivan's son Šišmundo Gundulić later four times. Ivan Gundulić was buried in the Franciscan church of Dubrovnik.

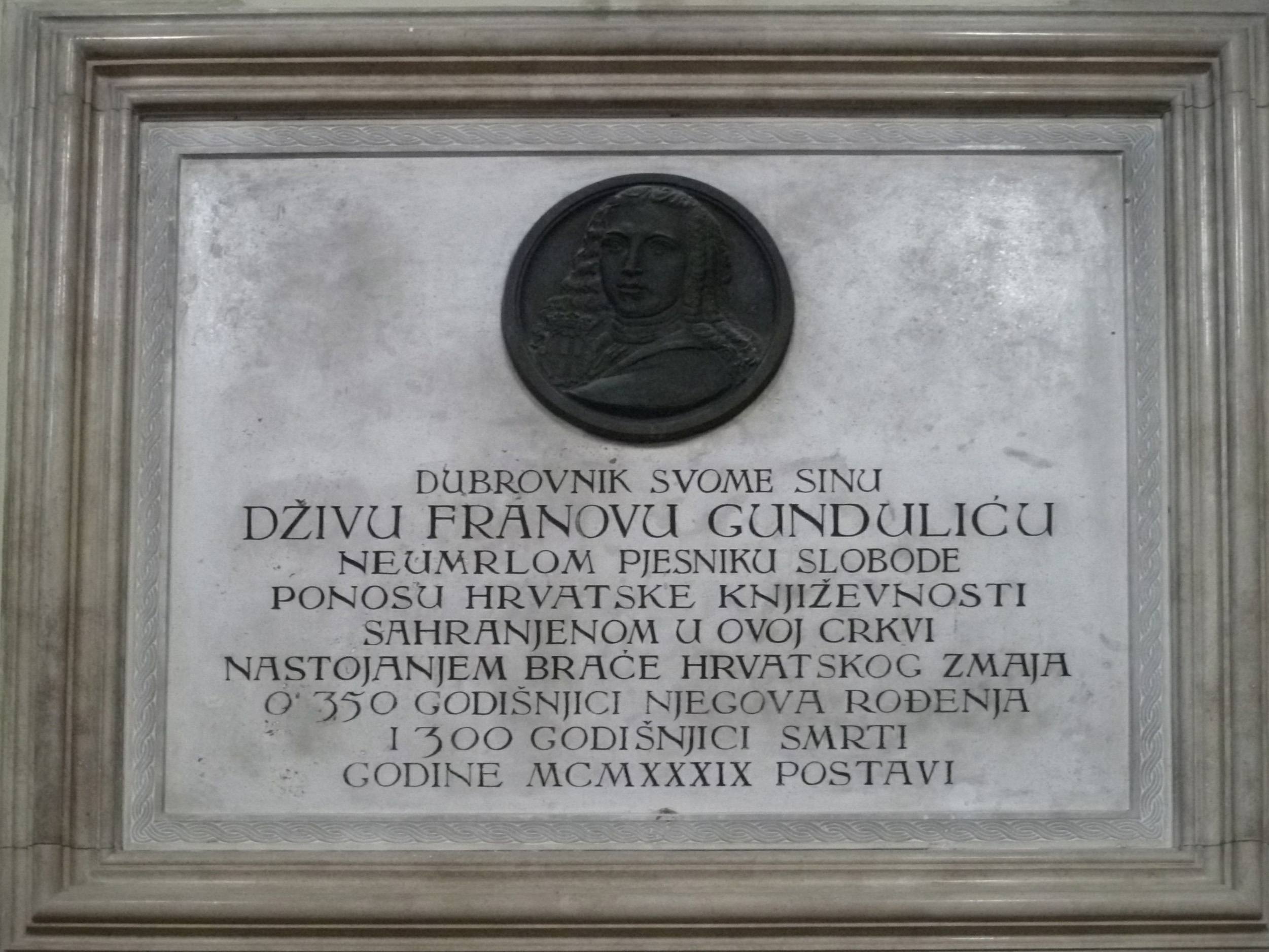
Tomb of Ivan Gundulić in the Franciscan church, Dubrovnik, where his name is spelled as Dživo Franov Gundulić (in dative case, meaning: John, Francis' son, Gundulić)

He began his literary career by writing poems and staging melodramas that became popular in Dubrovnik. But Ivan published only his larger works. His earlier work, which he referred to as a "brood of darkness", is now lost. His first publications were in 1621, when he rewrote several of David's Psalms and wrote several religious poems. He then wrote his famous Suze sina razmetnoga (Tears of the Prodigal Son) in 1622, composed of three "Cries": Sagriešenje (Sin), Spoznanje (Insight) and Skrušenje (Humility). In this poem Ivan presented the three basic categories of Christian faith: sin, repentance and redemption through contrasts such as between life and death, purity and sin, and Heaven and Hell. In 1637 when Ferdinand II of Tuscany married, Gundulić wrote a poem to honor the event, he noted that "all of Slavic people (Slovinski narod) honor you on this occasion".

=== Dubravka ===
Gundulić's most famous play is Dubravka, a pastoral written in 1628, where he rhapsodises on the former glory of Dubrovnik and contains some of the most famous verses in Croatian literature:

Croatian

O liepa, o draga, o slatka slobodo,
dar u kom sva blaga višnji nam Bog je dô,
uzroče istini od naše sve slave,
uresu jedini od ove Dubrave,
sva srebra, sva zlata, svi ljudcki životi
ne mogu bit plata tvôj čistoj lipoti.

English

Fair liberty, beloved liberty, liberty sweetly avowed,
thou are the treasured gift that God to us endowed,
all our glory is thy true creation,
to our Home thou are all the decoration,
no silver nor gold, not life itself could replace
the reward of thy pure and sublime grace.

=== Osman ===
In his greatest work, Osman, Gundulić presents the contrasts between Christianity and Islam, Europe and the Turks, West and East, and what he viewed as freedom and slavery. Osman had 20 cantos, but the 14th and the 15th were never found. Judging from the modern perspective, two approaches seem to dominate the contemporary appraisal of Gundulić's poetry: on one hand, his poetic influence has dimmed due to a change in aesthetic sensibility (Gundulić's chief literary predecessor and influence, Torquato Tasso, has undergone similar reassessment, but his artistic integrity and individuality have withstood the test of time better); while Gundulić's impact in the final standardisation of Croatian was overwhelming.

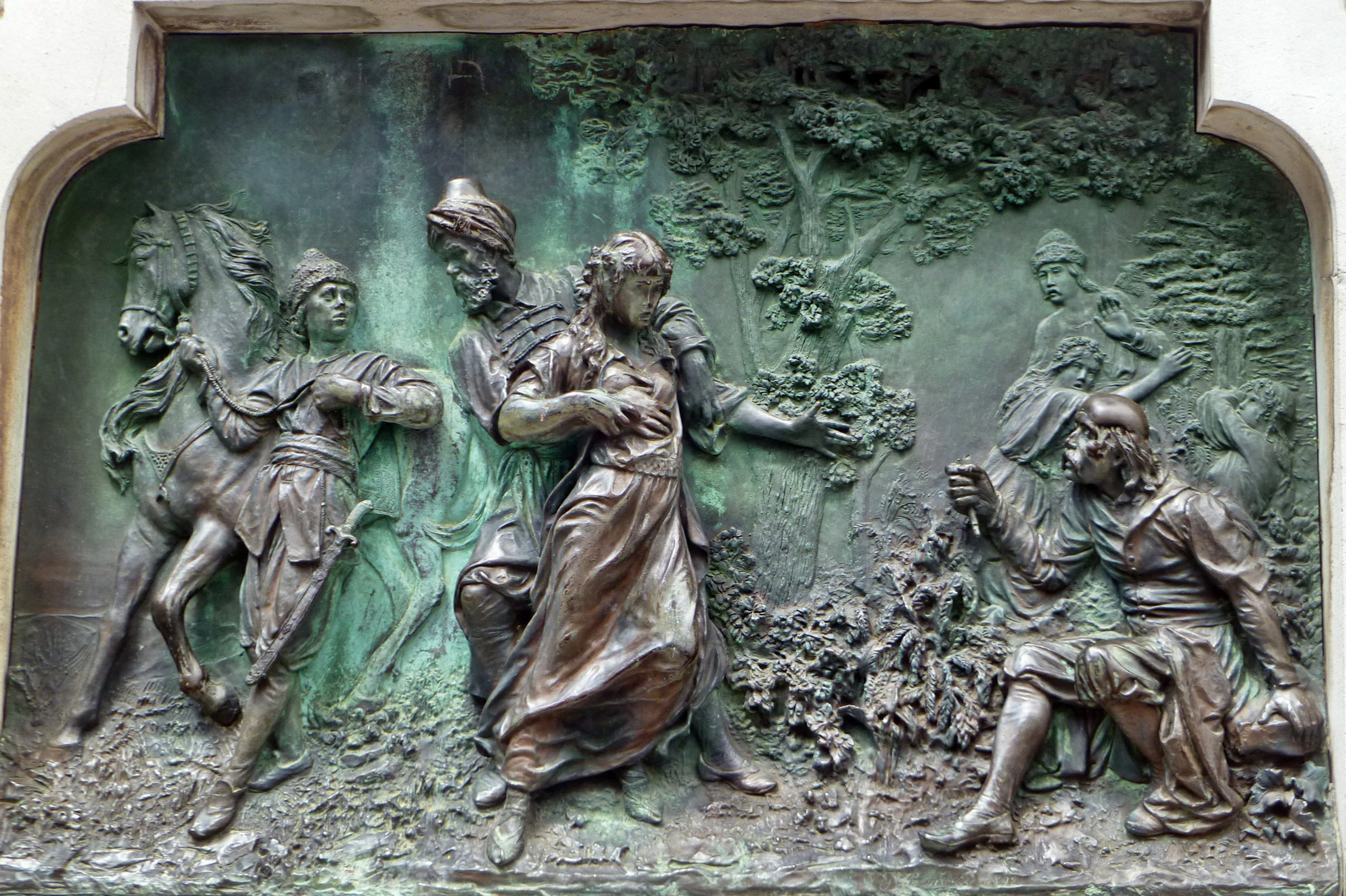
Bronze relief on the statue of Ivan Gundulić in Dubrovnik, showing a scene from the ninth canto where Sunčanica is taken to the Sultan's harem

Osman is firmly rooted within the rich literary tradition of the Croatian Baroque in Dubrovnik and Dalmatia and is considered as one of its apogees. By presenting the contrast of struggle between Christianity and Islam, Gundulić continued Marko Marulić's glorification of the fights against the invading Ottoman Turks. Besides magnifying Slavdom and the battles against the conquerors, Gundulić described the life of the Ottoman sultan Osman II. Gundulić constantly reminds the reader of the wheel of fortune and how the world is transient.

Osman begins with the Sultan's grasping of the situation caused by the 1621 Ottoman defeat at Chocim and descriptions of how the era of pre-Ottoman glory of the Bulgarians, Serbs, Hungarians, Albanians and especially the Poles could be easily restored. According to the storyline, Sultan Osman dispatched Ali-pasha to the Kingdom of Poland in order to negotiate peace and Kazlar-aga to choose which Polish noblewoman would suit him best for marriage. Gundulić describes the travels of both Ali-pasha and Kazlar-aga while paying much attention to the battle of Chocim and the enslaved Slavs that suffer under Ottoman rule. After numerous failed attempts to restore order in the empire, the army captures Osman and executes him, bringing the imprisoned Mustafa as the new sultan.

== Legacy ==
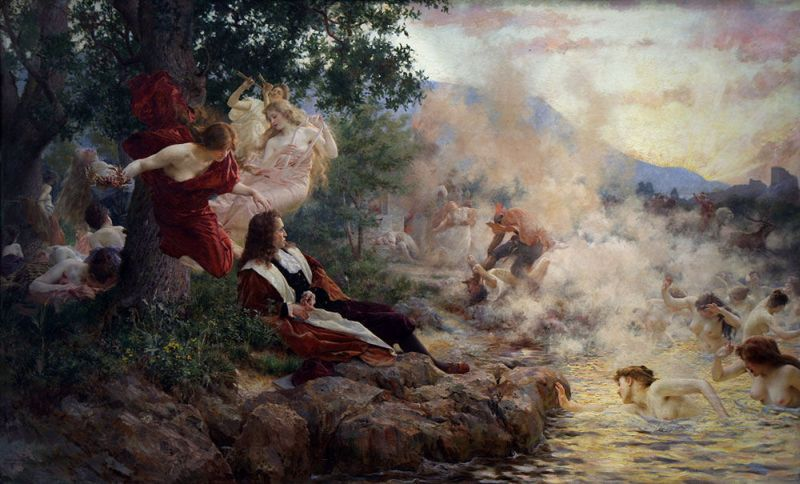
Gundulić's Dream by Vlaho Bukovac

Osman was printed for the first time in Dubrovnik in 1826, with the two missing cantos being replaced by poems written by the poet Petar Ignjat Sorkočević-Crijević (1749–1826), a direct descendant of Ivan Gundulić (his maternal grandmother Nikoleta Gundulić was Šišmundo Gundulić's daughter). Another descendant, Baron Vlaho Getaldić (grandson of Katarina Gundulić) introduced a hexameter treaty into Osman in 1865. Osman was not published in the integral edition until 1844, when the Illyrian movement chose Gundulić's oeuvre as a role model of Croatian. One of the leading Illyrists' men of letters, politician, linguist and poet Ivan Mažuranić, successfully completed Gundulić's Osman by composing the last two chapters, which were left unfinished upon the poet's death.

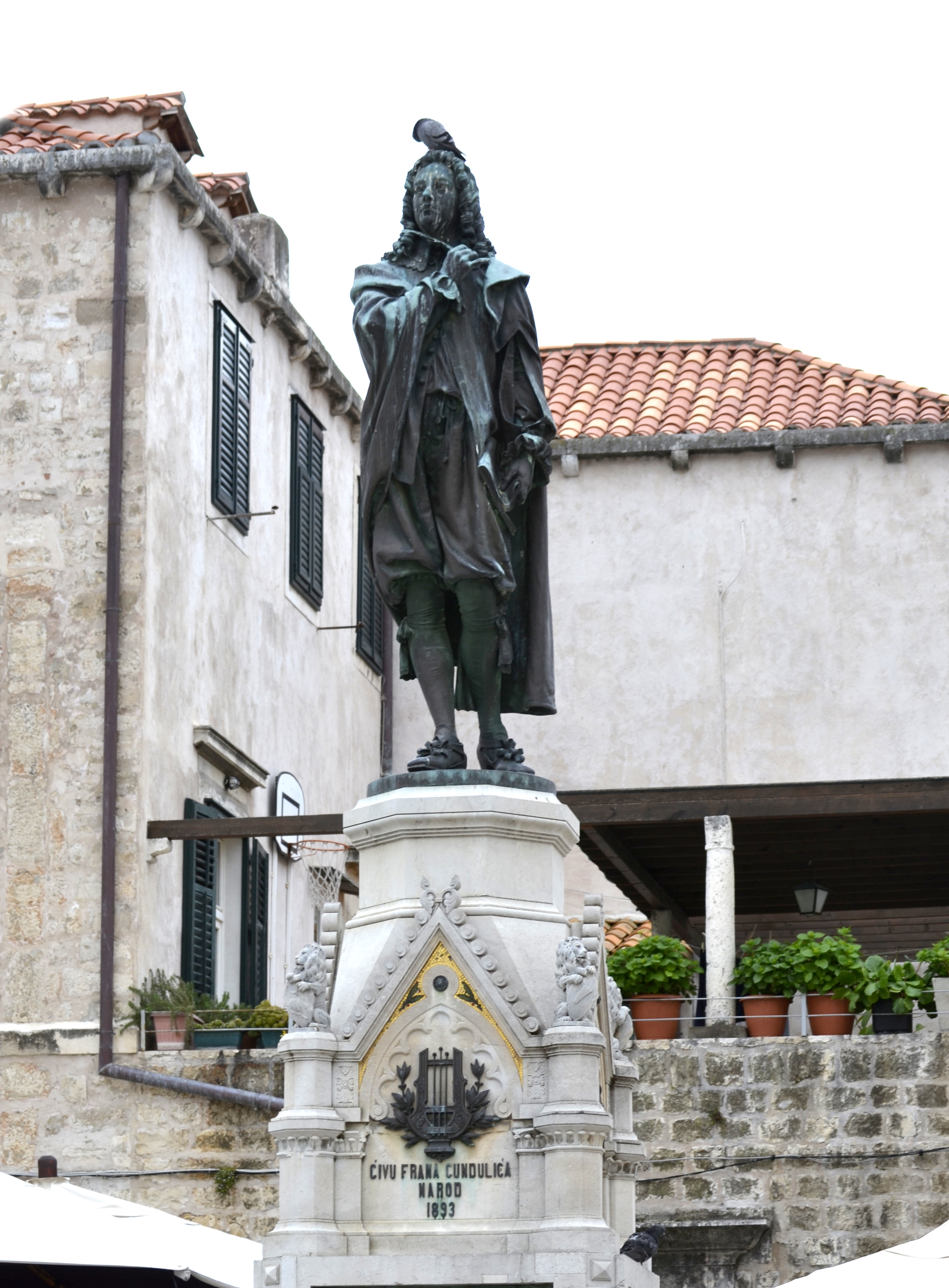
Monument to Ivan Gundulić in Dubrovnik

The monument to Gundulić by the sculptor Ivan Rendić was unveiled on 25 July 1893 in Dubrovnik's largest square, Poljana.

At a charity concert held for the children of war-torn Bosnia-Herzegovina in September 1995, Bono recited at the end of the song Miss Sarajevo the famous Ivan Gundulić verses: "O liepa, o draga, o slatka slobodo" ("Oh beautiful, oh precious, oh sweet Liberty").

The Sunčanica is a historical opera composed by Boris Papandopulo, with a libretto by Marko Soljačić based on Ivan Gundulić's Osman and his son Šišmundo Gundulić, who continued Osman with the Sunčanica history. It was first performed at the Croatian National Theatre in Zagreb (then the Croatian State Theatre in Zagreb) on June 13, 1942. The opera was produced by Branko Gavella, choreographed by Ana Roje and Oskar Harmoš, and its main role was played by Srebrenka Jurinac. In 2008, the opera was fully performed for the first time in 62 years when it opened the 16th Zajc's Days festival at the Croatian National Theatre Ivan pl. Zajc in Rijeka.

Gundulić's portrait was depicted on the obverse of the Croatian 50 kuna banknote, issued in 1993 and 2002.

== Ethnicity ==
According to John Van Antwerp Fine Jr., "Gundulić spoke of his people as "Slavs" and regarded all Slavs as being one great whole, a single people". Different researchers have described him as a Croatian poet. According to Marie-Janine Calic, professor of History at LMU Munich, following the Counter-Reformation, a new symbiosis arose between the reformed Catholicism and the (re-)emerging Croatian identity, that undoubtedly influenced the local Baroque art. Thus, this reformed Catholicism was one of the most important factors for developing a separate Croatian ethnic consciousness and Gundulić's poem Osman was expression of distinct Croatian (pre-)national feelings. According to Slobodan Drakulić, professor of sociology at Toronto Metropolitan University, the modern Croatian nationalism has as its antecedent a pre-modern Croatian nationalism, which was a 16-17th century indigenous social phenomenon, and one of its representatives was Gundulić.

On the other hand, Gundulić's ethnicity is part of the Serb-Croat distinctions in self-identification of the Western South Slavic enlighteners, that was one of the major problems in 20th century Yugoslavia.

Gundulić like other writers from Dubrovnik who wrote in Shtokavian dialect are claimed by Serbian scholars as a part of joint Serbian and Croatian cultural heritage. He has been included in The 100 most prominent Serbs list compiled by the SANU, and his works are included as a part of the Serbian literature by the Matica srpska, together with other Ragusian writers, in the fifth volume of Deset vekova srpske književnosti (Ten centuries of Serbian literature) released in 2010. In December 2021 was passed a cultural property law by the Serbian government in which Gundulić and other Dubrovnik writers are part of the shared Croatian and Serbian cultural heritage. Croatian scholars with HAZU, Matica hrvatska and representatives of the Croatian government condemn both claims about solely Serbian or joint cultural heritage as an example of Greater Serbian pretension of Croatian history and heritage.

== List of works ==
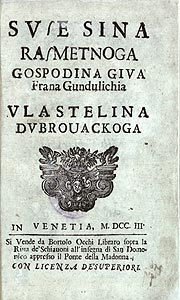
First edition cover of Tears of the Prodigal Son

- Tears of the Prodigal Son – poem (1622)
- Dubravka – pastoral drama (1628)
- Osman – baroque epic
- Arijadna – drama (1633)
- Pjesni pokorne kralja Davida – collection of poems (1621)

== See also ==
- House of Gundulić
- Lidiia Alekseeva, translator of his works into Russian
- Republic of Ragusa

== Bibliography ==
- Milčetić, Ivan (1912). "Gundulićev "Osman" u Vatikanskoj kńižnici" [Gundulić's "Osman" in the Vatican Library]. Građa za povijest književnosti hrvatske (in Serbo-Croatian). 7: 305–307.
