= Aspasius (disambiguation) =

Aspasius (c. 80–c. 150) was a Peripatetic philosopher.

Aspasius may also refer to:

- Aspasius of Byblos, 2nd century sophist
- Aspasius of Auch (died 560), Christian saint
- Aspasius of Ravenna (fl. 3rd century), Roman sophist
- Aspasius Paternus (fl. 3rd century), Roman senator
- Aspasius of Tyre, Greek rhetorician of unknown date

== See also ==
- Aspasia (disambiguation)
- Aśvaka, an ancient people of present-day Afghanistan and Pakistan, also known as the Aspasioi
