= Apsines (disambiguation) =

Apsines can refer to a number of people from classical antiquity:

- Apsines of Gadara, rhetorician from the 3rd century CE
- Apsines, an Athenian sophist mentioned in the Suda as being a 'noteworthy man', and father of Onasimus, but who is otherwise unknown.
- Apsines (sophist), son of Onasimus and son of the previous
