= Davidiad =

1517 poem by Marko Marulić

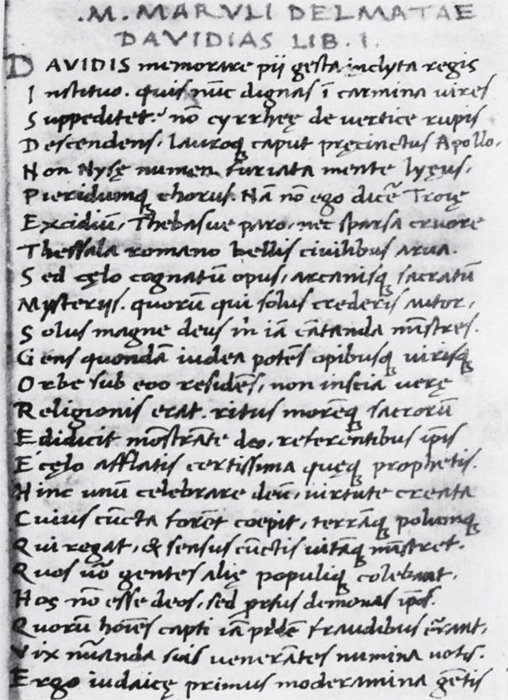
The Davidiad is an epic poem that details the ascension and deeds of David, the second king of the United Kingdom of Israel and Judah.

The Davidiad (also known as the Davidias) is the name of an heroic epic poem in Renaissance Latin by the Croatian national poet and Renaissance humanist Marko Marulić (whose name is sometimes Latinized as "Marcus Marulus"). Likely finished in AD 1517, the poem, as its Latin title suggests, details the ascension and deeds of David, the second king of the United Kingdom of Israel and Judah, who is said to have reigned c. 1010–970 BC.

== Origins and style ==
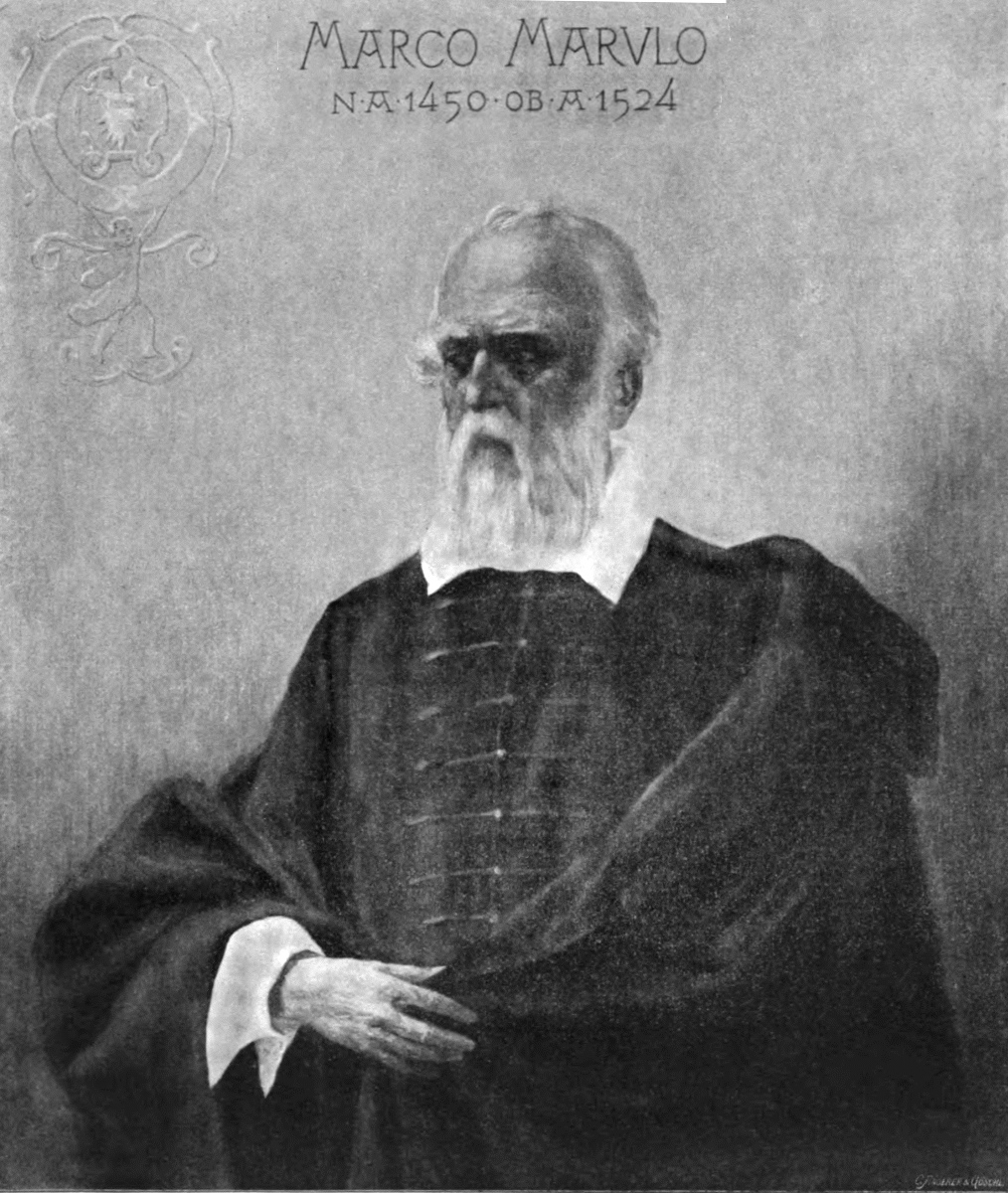
The Davidiad was written by Croatian national poet and Renaissance humanist Marko Marulić.

The author of the Davidiad, Marko Marulić was a nobleman, born on August 18, 1450, in the Dalmatian city of Split. He came from the distinguished aristocratic family of Pečenić (Pecinić, Picinić), the 15th century family branch whose founder was Petar, and only began calling themselves again Marulić in the 16th century. When he grew older, Marulić practised law in the city of his birth, serving as a judge, examiner of notarial entries, executor of wills, prosecutor, plea bargainer, and advocate. Marulić was also a prolific writer, who penned both poetry and prose in three languages: Latin, Croatian and Italian. Prior to writing the Davidiad, Marulić composed the Croatian poem Judita in 1501, which most scholars today consider his most important work.

In addition to the small portions that attempt to recall Homer, the Davidiad is heavily modeled off Virgil's Aeneid. This is so much the case that Marulić's contemporaries called him the "Christian Virgil from Split." Serbian-American philologist Miroslav Marcovich also detects "the influence of Ovid, Lucan, and Statius" in the work.

== Contents ==
The Davidiad itself is a versification of portions of the Hebrew Old Testament, detailing the events starting with the persecution of David by Saul (1 Samuel 15) and ending with David's death (1 Kings 2:11). For the most part, the poem is faithful to the Old Testament, although Marulić expands, modifies, and extrapolates from the parent text in a few places. Marcovich argues that these changes are usually done "to achieve special effects: poetic, rhetorical, [...] or moralizing; and sometimes for simply misunderstanding the source." Completed in 1517, the Davidiad comprises 6,765 hexameter lines among 14 books. A little over one third of those lines (2,386) are portions of speeches (there are 242 speeches in the poem, given by 63 different individuals); Latin scholar Miroslav Marcovich argues that this heavy focus on rhetoric is due to the "rhetorical character" of the source material. The Davidiad also includes 32 instances of comparisons (likely in an attempt to imitate Homer), as well as at least 50 instances of "moral sentences, ethic digressions, and Christian propaedeutics." These are of particular importance, as they index the author's character as "more [of] a Christian preacher and enlightener than a humanistic poet."

=== Summary ===
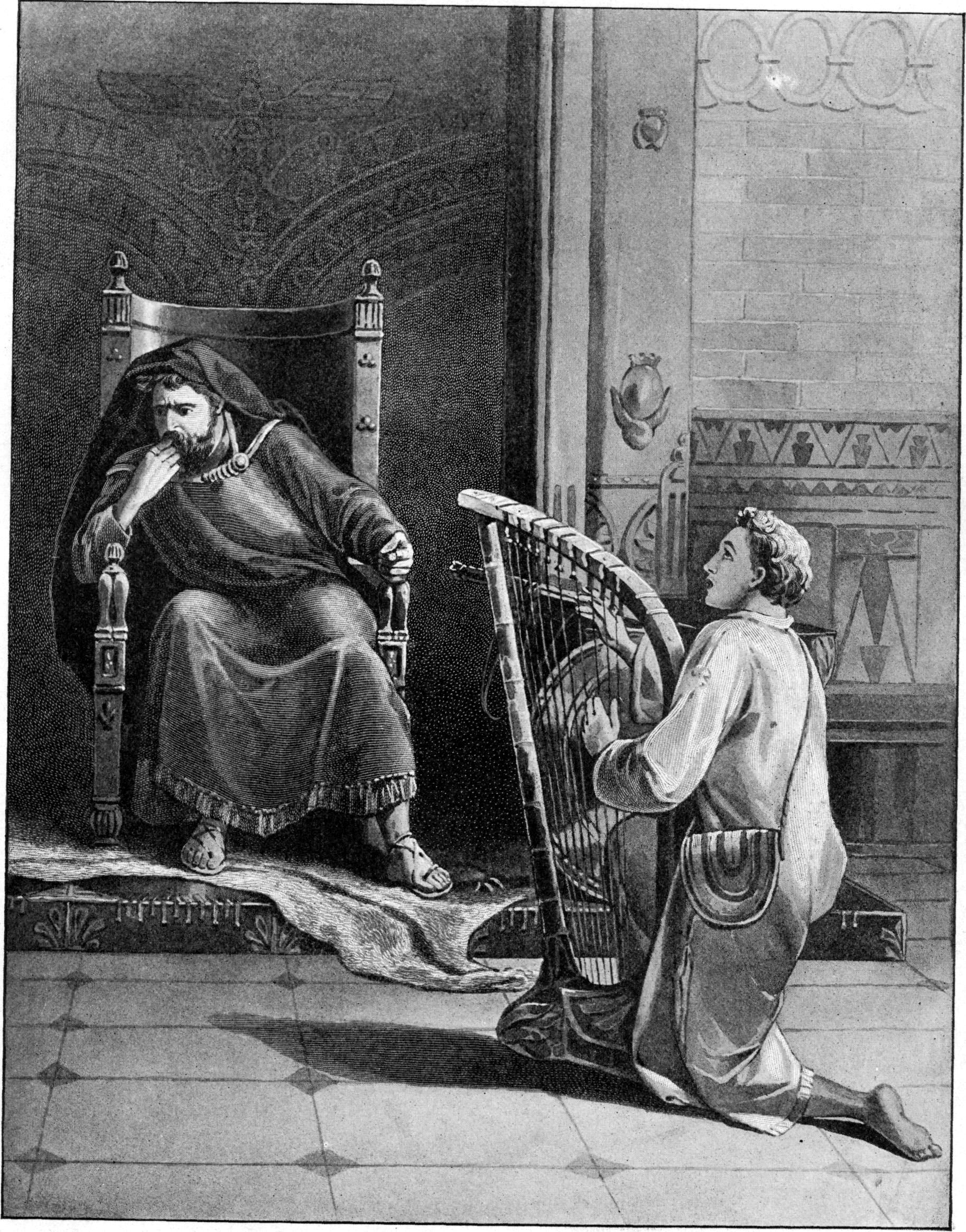
The first five books of the Davidiad detail King Saul's (left) attempts to capture and kill David (right).

Marulić opens the poem by stating his intentions "to tell ... the glorious deeds of David [the] pious king" (Davidis memorare pii gesta inclyta regis). Several lines later, the poet then distances himself from previous epic poems, maintaining that he does not want "to sing ... of the fall of Troy" (alluding to Virgil's Aeneid), "nor Thebes" (alluding to Statius's Thebaid), "nor of the fields of Thessaly, stained red with Roman blood in civil strife" (alluding to Lucan's Pharsalia) (ego dicere Troiae/excidium Thebasue paro nec sparsa cruore/Thessala Romano bellis civilibus arua). At line 11, Marulić explicitly invokes God, asking him to "aid his song" (mihi ... cantanda ministres). By contrasting his Davidiad with other famed Latin epics, the author is attempting to stress the "divine authority" of the Christian Bible at the expense of Classical mythology and the epic poetry inspired by Pagan religions.

Book I then shifts into narrative and details the events leading up to David's anointing: the prophet Samuel denounces Saul, the King of Israel for failing to obey the Lord; the prophet proclaims that Saul's kingdom will be taken away from him. Later, after Saul refrains from killing Agag, the king of the Amalekites, Samuel once again announces that Saul will be deposed as king and then Samuel himself hews the captive king into pieces. The Lord then leads Samuel to Jesse of Bethlehem, where the prophet discovers David and secretly appoints him as the future King of Israel. David eventually becomes the weapon-bearer of Saul, and during the war between the Israelites and the Philistines, he kills Goliath. After this loss, the Philistines flee the land.

In Book II, David develops a strong friendship with Saul's son, Jonathan. Eventually, Saul places David in command of the military, but after he hears his people singing that they prefer David to him, Saul plots to kill David. At first, the king feigns kindness to David, even offering him his younger daughter Michal (to whom David has been smitten), but he eventually orders his troops to kill the future king. Jonathan warns his beloved friend and then beseeches his father to spare him; Saul eventually acquiesces and promises not to harm David, who returns to Israel and fights off an army of Philistines. But Saul orders his troops to find David at his house and kill him. Before the soldiers, enter, Michal warns her husband (who escapes through a window) and bamboozles Saul's troops. When she is confronted by her father, she excuses her behavior.

In Book III, David flees and makes his way to Samuel, and the two journey to Naioth. When Saul learns of their location, he sends his troops to capture David, but the Spirit of the Lord overcomes them, and they prophesize. Frustrated, Saul himself journeys to Naioth, but he too begins to prophesize. David flees and eventually discusses the situation with Jonathan; the two renew their friendship. Soon thereafter, Saul accuses his son of aiding David, and he hurls a spear at him. Jonathan lets David know of this occurrence and the latter flees to Nob. Here, he is fed by the High Priest of Israel Ahimelech and given Goliath's sword. David then journeys to Gath—a Philistine city from whence Goliath came—and seeks refuge under the king, Achish, but eventually he decides that he is in danger and feigns insanity so as to escape. David goes to the cave of Adullam, where he is met by members of his father's household; eventually, David am amasses an ad hoc army of four hundred dissatisfied individuals. The prophet Gad then advises David to go to Judah. Meanwhile, Saul learns that Ahimelech aided David, and he orders Doeg the Edomite to kill Ahimelech and his entire company. Ahimelech's son Abiathar escapes the massacre and makes his way to David, who promises to protect him.

In Book IV, the Philistines attack the city of Keilah, and David repels their assault; however, when David discerns in prayer that the inhabitants of the city would turn him over to Saul, he flees into the Wilderness of Ziph. In time, the Ziphites approach Saul and promise to turn David over to him, but David escapes to the Wilderness of Maon. Saul initially gives chase, but his attention is diverted by a renewed Philistine invasion and David is able to secure some respite in a cave at Ein Gedi. After following the Philistines, Saul coincidentally journeys into the same cave. Given a chance to kill the king, David refuses; instead he secretly cuts off a corner of Saul's robe, and when Saul leaves the cave, he comes out to pay homage to Saul as the king and to demonstrate, using the piece of robe, that he holds no malice towards Saul. Moved by David's righteous, Saul and David are reconciled for the first time, and the former recognizes that the latter will indeed be the future king. Then, it is announced that Samuel has died. Afterwards, David journeys to the Desert of Paran, where he seeks provisions from Nabal, a rich man in the region. Nabal insults David, but Nabal's wife, Abigail, intervenes to avert David's wrath.

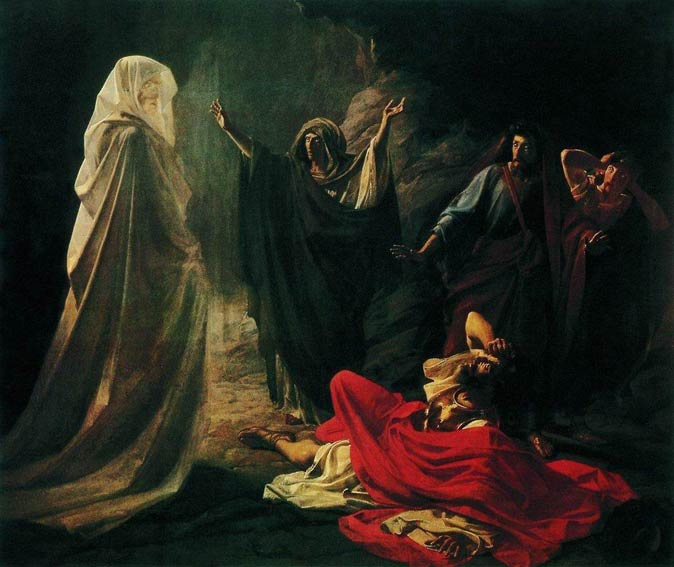
At the end of Book V, the specter of Samuel (left) is recalled from the abode of the dead by the Witch of Endor (center), on behest of Saul (bottom-right).

In Book V, Abigail does not initially tell her husband what she did, but when she does, he has a heart attack and dies. David then takes her on as his wife, and Saul gives Michal to Palti, son of Laish. Saul then returns to Ziph with his men to find David. When David hears of this, he slips into Saul's camp by night, and again restrains his men from killing the king; instead he steals Saul's spear and water jug, leaving his own spear thrust into the ground by Saul's side. The next day, David reveals himself to Saul, showing the jug and spear as proof that he could have slain him. David then persuades Saul to reconcile with him; the two swear never to harm each other. Then David goes to Philistine King Achish and asks to be considered a vassal (although he is secretly working against the Philistines). The king bestows the city of Ziklag to David and his men. David then routs the Geshurites, the Girzites, and the Amalekites nations, but he makes Achish think that he is marching against the Israelites. Meanwhile, the Philistines make war again against Saul, who Saul leads his army to face them at Mount Gilboa. Before the battle the king goes to consult the Witch of Endor. The medium, unaware of his identity, reminds him that the king has made witchcraft a capital offence, but he assures her that Saul will not harm her. She conjures the spirit of the prophet Samuel, who before his death had prophesied that Saul would lose the kingdom. The shade of Samuel tells the king that God will no longer hear his prayers and that the next day he will lose both the battle and his life. Saul collapses in fear, and the medium restores him with food.

In Book VI, the Philistines are poised to clash with Saul, but before the battle, they think it best to send David away, as they mistrust him. While the Philistines advance into the land of Jezreel, David returns to Ziklag to find that Amalekites had carried away a number of women and children; David pursues the band of thieves and recovers what was stolen. Meanwhile, the Israelite and Philistines armies engage in battle, and the former is defeated on Mount Gilboa. In the fray, Saul and his sons perish. After the battle, the Philistines emerge victorious and desecrate the body of Saul. The inhabitants of Jabesh-gilead, however, manage to bury the fallen king. In Ziklag, David learns of the disaster that has befallen Saul; he mourns the king and Jonathan, as well as the survivors of the battle. He then curses Mount Gilboa.

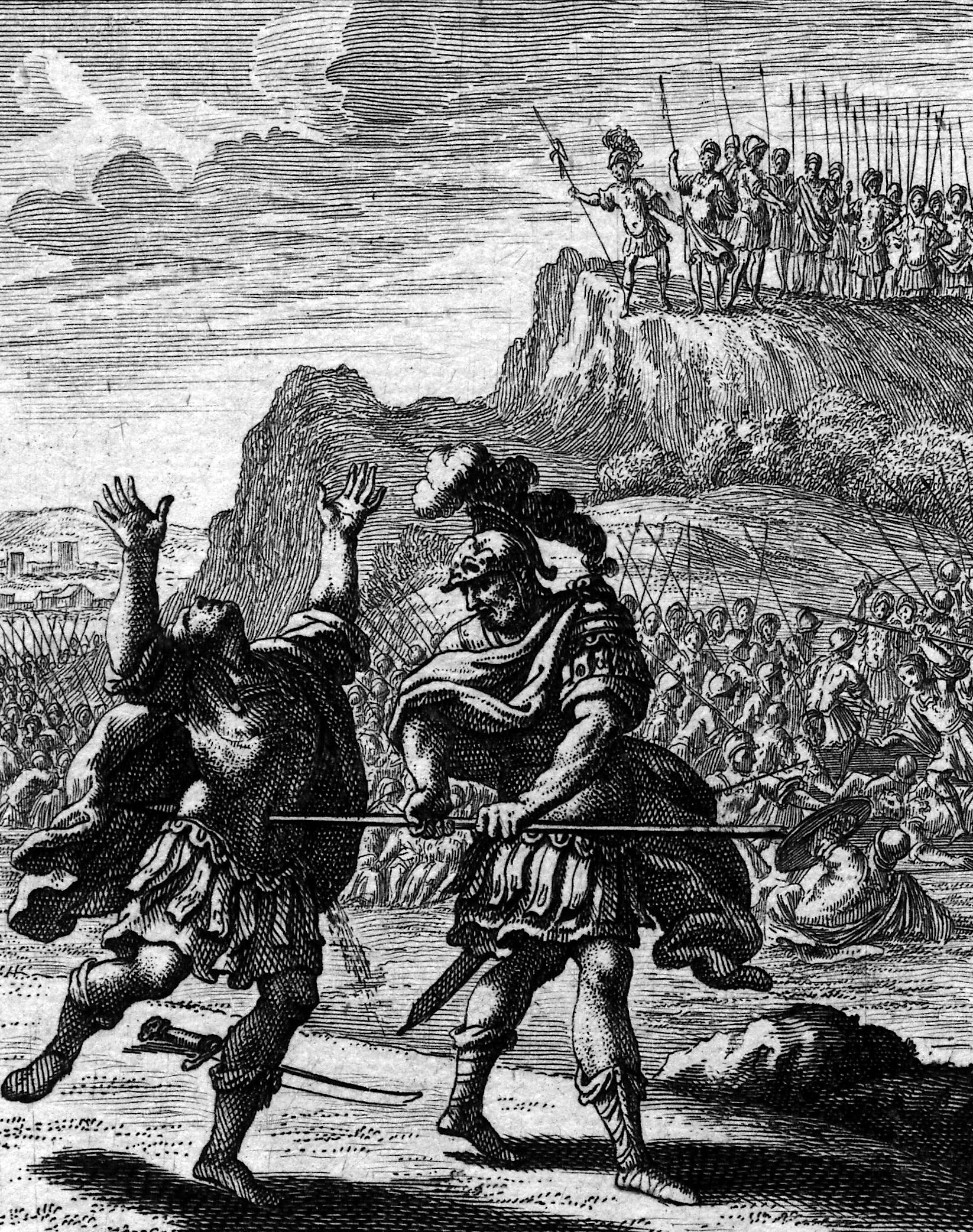
Book VIII details Abner's killing of Asahel.

In Book VII, David goes to Hebron and is anointed king. Once he learns that the inhabitants of Jabesh-gilead buried Saul, he blesses them for their actions. Meanwhile, the commander of Saul’s army, Abner declares Saul's son Ish-Bosheth as the king of Israel, and he reigns for two years; meanwhile, the tribe of Judah sides with David, who ruled over Hebron for seven years and six months. Eventually, twelve chosen men from both Ish-Bosheth and David's side fight at Gibeon, and it is here that Asahel, the brother of Ioab is killed by Abner. Asahel is buried him in his father’s tomb at Bethlehem. Joab then returns to Hebron and announces what has happened. Eventually, a number of sons were born to David. Ish-bosheth accuses Abner of sleeping with Rizpah, one of Saul's concubines, and because of this rebuke, Abner and immediately opens negotiations with David, who welcomes him on the condition that his wife Michal should be restored to him. Soon thereafter, Ioab returns to Hebron, he kills Abner, revenging the death of Asahel. Rechab and Baanah, expecting a reward from David, kill Ish-bosheth; the two, however, are executed by David's men, and the head of Ish-Bosheth is buried in Abner’s tomb at Hebron. Eventually, David is proclaimed king of Israel and he conquers Jerusalem and the fortress of Zion, expelling the Jebusites.

In Book VIII, Hiram, the king of Tyre sends David material with which he can build a palace, and David soon gains more wives. The Philistines spread out in the Valley of Rephaim, but David and his men strike them down all the way from Gibeon to Gezer. David and his men retrieve the Ark of the Covenant from Baalah and attempt to return it to Jerusalem. After the Israelite Uzzah accidentally touches the Ark, he is killed. David becomes scared of its power and initially has it placed in the house of Obed-Edom the Gittite. Eventually, he relents and has it brought to Jerusalem. While the Ark is being brought into the city, David dances before it; Michal criticizes the king for this action, and for this she is punished with not having children until her death. God communicates through Nathan, announcing the Davidic covenant. Blessed by the Lord, David soon wins a number of major battles and subdues his enemies.

In Book IX, David finds Jonathan's son, Mephibosheth, restored Saul's inheritance to him, and permits him to live within the royal palace in Jerusalem. David then tells Ziba that he will serve Mephibosheth. Meanwhile, Hanun of Ammon embarrasses some of David's men and allies himself with the Syrian king Hadadezer against Israel; however, he is defeated and deposed. Soon thereafter, David commits adultery with Bathsheba and impregnates her. He therefore plots the death of her husband, Uriah the Hittite; for this God sends disasters against David's house. Nathan tells David that the sword shall never depart from his house. David expresses sincere repentance, but his and Bathsheba's child is struck with a severe illness and dies, unnamed, a few days after birth, which David accepts as his punishment. Within time, Bethsheba bears Solomon. Elsewhere in the kingdom, Joab is about to assault Amman, and he calls for David. The king musters an army, captures the city, seizes the leader's crown, and returns triumphant to Jerusalem.

In Book X, David's son, Amnon, rapes his half-sister Thamar. David cannot bring himself to punish his son, and so later at a banquet, Absalom (Thamar's full-brother) kills Amnon in revenge. Realizing what he has done, he flees to the land of Geshur, ruled by Talmai. Joab, with the help of a wise women from Tuqu', manages to convince David to recall his son; Joab then brings Absalom back to Jerusalem, where he lives for two years without coming into the king’s presence. Absalom is unable to convince Joab to let him see the king, and so he burns the harvest of Joab. Eventually, he makes his way before his father and asks David why he was recalled; David then forgives his son and then kisses him. Nevertheless, Absalom usurps power in the kingdom, forcing David to flee Jerusalem. The king then sends Hushai to spy on his son and to thwart the counsel of Absalom's advisor Ahithophel.

In Book XI, Siba, a servant, offers gifts to David and accuses his master Mephibosheth of rebellion. David flees from Absalom and arrives at Bahurim, where Shimei curses him. Absalom, advised by Ahithophel, abuses his father's concubines. Ahithophel seeks to pursue David, but Hushai intervenes and advises against it. Hushai sends messengers to warn David, who flees upon hearing Absalom's soldiers are approaching. Ahithophel, in despair over his rejected counsel, hangs himself. David enters Mahanaim, while Absalom crosses the Jordan and appoints Amasa as commander. They encamp in Gilead, and David's forces, led by Joab, Abishai, and Ittai, defeat Absalom, who is killed while fleeing. David mourns Absalom's death but spares those who were with him.

In Book XII, the tribe of Judah first meets David as he returns to Jerusalem. Shimei is pardoned for his curses, and Ziba, with his sons, also arrives. Mephibosheth, in mourning attire, complains about Ziba, and the king orders them to divide the property. Barzillai the Gileadite, invited to live in Jerusalem, declines due to age and leaves his son Chimham with David. The other tribes argue with Judah over meeting the king. Sheba incites a rebellion, and Joab kills Amasa under false pretenses. He and Abishai besiege Abel, where Sheba is hiding. Persuaded by a woman, the citizens kill Sheba. A three-year famine occurs because Saul had broken an oath to the Gibeonites. David hands over seven men from Saul's house, who are hanged. Rizpah guards their bodies, and David moves Saul and Jonathan's bones to Benjamin, ending the famine. David is no longer allowed in battle after being saved by Abishai from Ishbi-benob. Subsequent battles see Sibbecai kill Saph, Elhanan kill Goliath, and Jonathan kill a man with twenty-four digits.

In Book XIII, David, freed from his enemies, praises the Lord and gives thanks. Near death, he sings psalms predicting Christ's mysteries. He compiles a catalog of Israel's mightiest men. Joab, ordered to count the warriors, does so, but David admits his sin in this. Given three punishment options, David chooses pestilence. He sees an angel striking the people and builds an altar on Araunah's threshing floor, offering sacrifices to end the plague. In the third book of Kings, chapter one, David, now old, is cold. Abishag the Shunammite sleeps with him to keep him warm, but he leaves her untouched.

In Book XIV, Adonijah, David's son by Haggith, aspires to the throne. Bathsheba complains to David that Adonijah reigns despite David's promise to Solomon. Solomon is anointed king by David's order, causing Adonijah's followers to flee. Adonijah seeks refuge at the altar, is pardoned, and bows to Solomon. On his deathbed, David instructs Solomon to worship God, punish Joab for killing commanders Abner and Amasa in peacetime, control the seditious Shimei, and treat Barzillai's sons kindly. David dies and is buried in the fortress of Zion, having reigned for forty years: seven in Hebron and thirty-three in Jerusalem.

=== Tropologica Davidiadis Expositio ===
When Marulić completed his poem, he affixed a prose appendix to the work, known as the Tropologica Davidiadis Expositio ("A Tropological Explanation of the Davidiad"). The purpose of this addendum was to stress the poet's belief that David "is a prototype or prefiguration of Christ" and that "all the events of the New Testament lie hidden and anticipated in the Old Testament". Marulić thus believed that his work could be read as an allegory, wherein David represented Christ (In omnibus fere Davidem puto personam gerere Christi), and Saul represented the Jews who persecuted Jesus (Saulem autem Iudeos, qui Christum persequebantur, significare). In this section, Marulić defends his work as orthodox and non-heretical. However, as Miroslav Marcovich argues, "it is not difficult to discover that Marulić's allegoric Tropology does indeed aberrare a relgionis nostrae fide [stray from the faith of our religion]"; for instance, how could David be the "prefiguration of Christ", Marcovich asks, when David committed grave sins like adultery and murder?

Marcovich points out that the line dummodo a religionis nostrae fide nusquam aberret ("So long as it never deviates from the orthodoxy of our religion") in the Tropologica manuscript is marked by the autograph of someone who was not Marulić. Marcovich contends that this autograph likely belonged to Domenico Grimani, the cardinal and patriarch of Aquileia to whom the poem was dedicated. Given that the Davidiad was never officially published, Marcovich reasons that Grimani marked the aforementioned line and used it as justification to withhold an imprimatur. Marulić likely knew that his novel assertions could cause issues, and he had indeed reached out to Grimani in a letter, asking for his approval, but Grimani never acquiesced. Given that the Davidiad itself does not stray from the Biblical stories of David, it is likely that only the Tropologica that prevented the poem from ever being released.

== Textual history ==
The Davidiad is known from only one extant manuscript (known as "T"), which was a manuscript penned by Marulić himself. Unfortunately, by 1567 this copy had been misplaced, which prompted the chancellor of Split, Antonius Proculianus, to bemoan that such a great work of art had been lost. Marulić's copy eventually found its way to the National Library at Turin, where it remained uncommented upon and relatively unnoticed for hundreds of years. By the early 1920s, the manuscript had been catalogued by the library and dubbed "Codex G-VI/40"; scholars at the time, however, did not realize that this was the long-lost manuscript of Marulić. Given this, the Davidiad is often said to have been properly rediscovered in 1952, when Carlo Dionisotti came across the manuscript and realized both what it was and that it remained unpublished.

The editio princeps was published by Josip Badalić of the Yugoslav Academy of Sciences and Arts in 1954, but this work "proved to be a failure," as whole verses were ignored and many words were misread by the editor. Several years later, in 1957, Miroslav Marcovich over came the difficulties that plagued Badalić's work and produced a more usable critical edition. The Latinist Veljko Gortan later corrected around 50 instances of wrongly-read words and published his own critical edition in 1974. His version, however, had its own issues—Gortan had been working with reproductions of the original text, not ms. T itself, and his edition also lacked a critical apparatus. Using the corrections made by Gortan, Marcovich then published a second edition of his work in 2006; this edition also included facsimiles of ms. T.

Today, Manuscript T is somewhat hard to read, for a number of reasons. First, Marulić's handwriting can be difficult to decipher in places. Second, the author took to liberally annotating his work with numerous additions, modifications, and corrections. Third and finally, the text was damaged both by a fire that broke out at the Turin National University Library in 1904, as well as the water which was used to extinguish the blaze.

=== Translations ===
A literary translation of the Davidiad into Croatian hexameters was made by Branimir Glavačić and published facing the Latin original by Veljko Gortan in 1974. In 2024, Edward Mulholland, a Classicist from Benedictine College, published the first complete English translation of the Davidiad in un-rhymed iambic pentameter. The work, which also includes an English translation of the Tropologica Expositio, was released as an entry in LYSA Publishers's "LYNX" book series dedicated to neo-Latin texts. In 2023, Mulholland's translation of Book XIV had previously been named an honorable mention during the British Centre for Literary Translation's John Dryden Translation Competition.

== Bibliography ==
- Bruere, Richard T. (1959). "Review of M. Maruli Davidiadis Libri XIV". Classical Philology. 54 (3): 197–99. doi:10.1086/364389. ISSN 0009-837X. JSTOR 266801.
- Gutsche, George J. (1975). "Classical Antiquity in Marulić's Judita". The Slavic and East European Journal. 19 (3): 310–21. doi:10.2307/306288. ISSN 0037-6752. JSTOR 306288.
- Halpern, Baruch (2000). "David". In Freedman, David Noel; Myers, Allen C. (eds.). Eerdmans Dictionary of the Bible. Grand Rapids, Michigan: William B. Eerdmans Publishing Company. ISBN 9789053565032.
- K̄adić, Ānte (1959). "Croatian Renaissance". Studies in the Renaissance. 6: 28–35. doi:10.2307/2857180. ISSN 0081-8658. JSTOR 2857180.
- Krešić, Stéphane (1973). "Croatian Neo-Latinists". In Ijsewijn, Jozef; Kessler, Eckhard (eds.). Acta Conventus Neo-Latini Lovaniensis: Proceedings of the First International Congress of Neo-Latin Studies, Louvain, 23–28 August 1971. Leuven, Belgium: Leuven University Press. pp. 347–59.
- Lučin, Bratislav (2007). "Introduction". The Marulić Reader. Split, Croatia: Književni Krug. pp. 7–31. ISBN 9789531632843.
- Marcovich, Miroslav (1973). "On the Davidiad of Marko Marulic". In Ijsewijn, Jozef; Kessler, Eckhard (eds.). Acta Conventus Neo-Latini Lovaniensis: Proceedings of the First International Congress of Neo-Latin Studies, Louvain, 23–28 August 1971. Leuven, Belgium: Leuven University Press. pp. 371–80.
- Marcovich, Miroslav (2006). "Preface". Davidias. Leiden, Netherlands: Brill Publishers. pp. vii–x. ISBN 9789004149632.
- Marulić, Marko (2006). Marcovich, Miroslav (ed.). Davidias. Leiden, Netherlands: Brill Publishers. ISBN 9789004149632.
- Marulić, Marko (2024). The Davidiad. Translated by Mulholland, Edward. LYSA Publishers. doi:10.54179/2401. ISBN 9789464753134.
- Marulić, Marko (2007). "Davidias". In Lučin, Bratislav (ed.). The Marulić Reader. Translated by Matešić, Sanja. Split, Croatia: Književni Krug. pp. 172–205. ISBN 9789531632843.
- Matasović, Maja (2016). "Polemical Theology in Jakov Bunić's De vita et gestis Christi". In Zavarský, Svorad; Nicholas, Lucy R.; Riedl, Andrea (eds.). Themes of Polemical Theology Across Early Modern Literary Genres. Newcastle upon Tyne, UK: Cambridge Scholars Publishing. pp. 99–116. ISBN 9781443892834.
- Stepanić, Gorana (2014). "Neo-Latin Literature—The Balkans (Croatia)". In Kallendorf, Craig (ed.). Brill's Encyclopaedia of the Neo-Latin World. doi:10.1163/9789004271296_enlo_B9789004271029_0067. ISBN 9789004265721.
- Thomas, David; Chesworth, John A., eds. (2015). "Central and Eastern Europe". Christian-Muslim Relations. A Bibliographical History.: Volume 7. Central and Eastern Europe, Asia, Africa and South America (1500–1600). Leiden, Netherlands: Brill Publishers. pp. 29–549. ISBN 9789004298484.

This article incorporates translated text from a publication now in the public domain: Marulić, Marko (c. 1517). Davidiad (in Latin). Retrieved November 28, 2018.
