= Polyeuctus (name) =

Polyeuctus (also Polyeuctes, Polyeuktos, Ancient Greek: Πολύευκτος, romanized: Polýeuktos) is a Greek name with meaning πολύ + ευκτος, "very" + "desired". The Russian surname Puluektov is derived from it (in slightly different spellings: ru:Полуэктов, ru:Полуектов, as well as the noble family of ru:Полуехтовы (Poluekhtovs)).

Notable people with the name include:

- Polyeuctus of Constantinople (died 970), Ecumenical Patriarch of Constantinople
- Polyeuctus of Melitene (died 259), ancient Roman saint
- Polyeuctus of Sphettus (died after 324), Athenian orator, contemporary and political ally of Demosthenes
- Metropolitan Anean Polyeuktos (1912–1988), bishop of the Orthodox Church of Constantinople, Metropolitan of Anean Metropolis

== Fictional characters ==
- Poluekt Khrisanfovich Nevstruev, minor character in the Russian novel Monday Begins on Saturday by Strugatsky Brothers
