= Christian Latin literature =

Christian Latin literature has a long history with its foundations being laid during the 4th and 5th centuries. They included the church fathers Augustine of Hippo, Jerome, and Ambrose, and the Christian poet, Prudentius.

== History ==
The earliest language of the Christian Church was koine Greek, which was the language of the Eastern Roman empire in the 1st century AD. However, as Christianity spread through other parts of the Roman empire where Latin was used, a growing body of Latin literature was produced.

The earliest Latin Christian writings were translations of portions of the Bible. These have not been preserved, but are cited by Tertullian and Novatian in Rome. A distinction is made between ‘North African’ and ‘European’ translations on the basis of differences which appear in the authors from the respective locales.

Until the end of the 3rd century, the main genre was apologetics (justifications of Christianity), by writers such as Minucius Felix, Tertullian, Arnobius, and Lactantius. St Jerome translated the Bible into Latin in the 4th century, producing an edition known as the Vulgate. This led to the increased use of Latin by the Church Fathers of the 4th century, including Ambrose, and St Augustine of Hippo. Much of what they wrote was concerned with the theological controversies of the time, such as Arianism.

For a long time there was an idea of opposition between Christian documents and other Profane (religion) literature and some Christians were encouraged to study the Bible alone and ‘give up the idle talk of the school’. Others, such as Augustine and Ambrose, encouraged the use of non-Biblical literature as a means to understanding God better.

Other forms of literature were blossoming, with the emergence of Commodian, the first Christian poet.

In the Middle Ages, Latin was still the main language for literature in Western Europe. Plays written in Latin were often part of medieval Easter celebrations, and there were other forms of drama in Latin. Latin was also used for religious lyric poetry and epic verse such as Walafrid Strabo's 9th-century "De visionibus Wettini" (a predecessor of Dante's vernacular Divine Comedy), while Jesuits such as Jakob Masen (author of Sarcotis, a probable influence on Milton's Paradise Lost) also produced Latin epic verse as late as the 17th century. Summa Theologica, is the best-known work of Thomas Aquinas, was written in Latin.

Jesuit poet Diego José Abad wrote the didactic, humanist religious poem De Deo heroica carmina (1769-1780), which was begun in Mexico and finished in Italy. It is written in Latin hexameter, in a strong style. It is divided into two parts, a Summa theologica and a life of Christ.

== Notable writers ==
- Ambrose (Aurelius Ambrosius), archbishop of Milan and theologian
- Augustine of Hippo, author of Confessions and theology
- St Jerome, translator of the Vulgate edition of the Christian Bible into Latin
- Coelius Sedulius (c.450)
- Romanos the Melodist (ca. 490 — 556)
- Venantius Fortunatus (530 - 609)
- Jacob Masen, German author of poetry, drama, history, and theology
- Prudentius, poet
- Walafrid Strabo, Frankish writer of poetry, theology, and history
- Tertullian, author of theological works
- John Scotus Eriugena, (c. 800-877)
- Thomas Aquinas, Dominican theologian and philosopher in the scholastic tradition
- Marko Marulić, Croatian poet, Renaissance humanist, and Latin poet dubbed "The Christian Virgil".
- Marco Girolamo Vida (c.1485 - 1566)
- Jacob Bidermann (1578-1639) Austrian Jesuit priest and Latin playwright
- Maciej Kazimierz Sarbiewski (1596-1640), Polish Jesuit poet in Renaissance Latin and theorist of prosody
- Samuel Johnson (1709-1784), English lexicographer, whose devotional works of Christian poetry in Latin have since been translated into English by Louisiana-based American poet David Middleton.
