= Marko Marulić =

Croatian national poet and European humanist

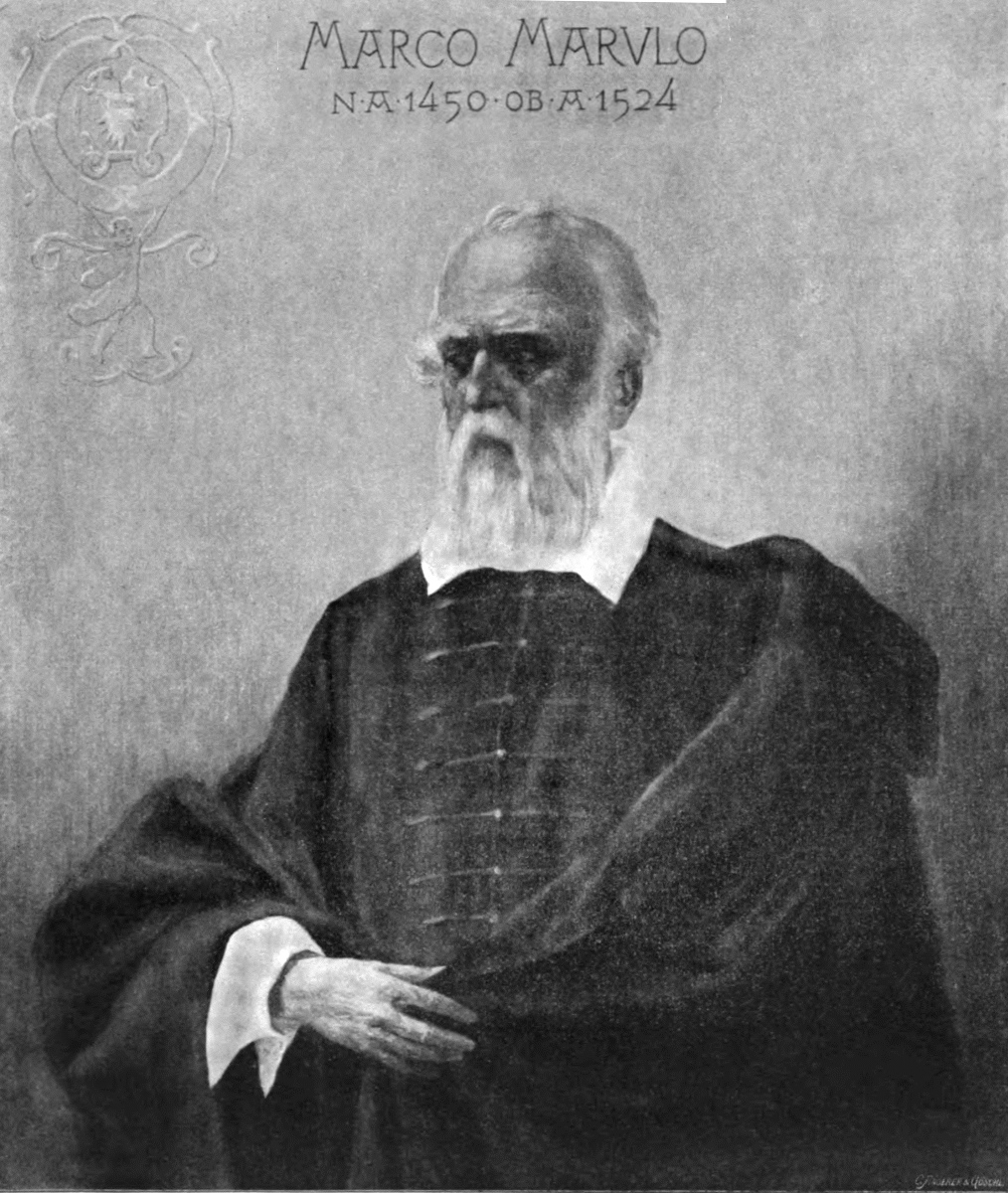
- 1903 illustration
- Born: 18 August 1450; Spalato, Republic of Venice (modern-day Split, Croatia)
- Died: 5 January 1524 (aged 73); Spalato, Republic of Venice (modern-day Croatia)
- Occupations: Poet, humanist
- Writing career
- Language: Latin, Croatian
- Period: Renaissance
- Notable works: Judita; Davidiad

Marko Marulić Splićanin (pronounced [mâːrko mǎrulitɕ splîtɕanin]; (Note: Marko Marulić Splićanin ("Marko Marulić of Split") is the form he himself used to sign his works.) Latin: Marcus Marulus Spalatensis; (Note: Alternative Latin forms include Marcus de Marulis and Marcus Marulus Dalmata ("the Dalmatian").) 18 August 1450 – 5 January 1524) was a Croatian poet, lawyer, judge, and Renaissance humanist. He is the national poet of Croatia. According to George J. Gutsche, Marulić's epic poem Judita "is the first long poem in Croatian", and "gives Marulić a position in his own literature comparable to Dante in Italian literature." Marulić's Latin poetry is of such high quality that his contemporaries dubbed him "The Christian Virgil." He has been called the "crown of the Croatian medieval age", the "father of the Croatian Renaissance", and "The Father of Croatian literature."

Marulić scholar Bratislav Lučin notes that he was well-versed in both the Christian Bible and in the Fathers of the Church. At the same time, Marulić also attentively read the Pre-Christian Greek and Latin Classics. He read and interpreted Latin epigrams, wrote glosses on the erotic poetry of Catullus, read Petronius' Satyricon, and admired Erasmus of Rotterdam. Marulić also composed humanist elegies, satirical poetry, erotic epigrams inspired by Ovid, and Latin Christian poetry inspired not only by the epics of Homer and Virgil, but also by Lucan, Statius, Faltonia Betitia Proba, Juvencus, Venantius Fortunatus, Cyprianus Gallus, Coelius Sedulius, and many other both Pagan and Christian writers in the same language.

According to Franz Posset, Marulić aspired to the Renaissance humanist ideal of the uomo universale ("universal man"). To this end, he was interested in painting and drawing, local and national history, languages, and poetry. His overall goal always remained renovatio Christiana ("The Renewal of Christianity") as represented by the future Counter-Reformation. Accordingly, like many other Renaissance humanists who shared his views, Marulić denounced simony and immorality among Catholic priests and members of the hierarchy in often violent language throughout his writings.

Marulić's work was admired both by many of the greatest and most influential Catholic saints of the Counter-Reformation and also, since much of Marulić could be read without violating sola scriptura, by generations of believers in Protestantism.

His writings in Renaissance Latin, once adored and envied across Europe, shared the destiny that befell most Renaissance Humanist literature and faded into obscurity. According to Lučin, however, the passage of time has slowly revealed the important web of influence that the poet and writer wove all over Europe and far beyond its borders. Marulić's writings were admired by churchmen such as Saints Francis Xavier, Francis de Sales, Peter Canisius, and Charles Borromeo, by monarchs and statesmen such as King Henry VIII, Thomas More, and Emperor Charles V, emulated by poets like Jan Dantyszek, Conrad Peutinger, and Francisco de Quevedo, and translated into vernacular verse by still other poets; including Fray Luis de León, St Philipp Howard, Rhina Espaillat, and Edward Mulholland. Furthermore, manuscripts of Marulić works previously thought lost, such as his Christian epic poem the Davidiad in 1952, his Latin-Croatian literary translation of Thomas à Kempis' The Imitation of Christ in 1989, and the Glasgow Codex in 1995, continue to resurface and to belatedly see publication for the first time.

One of Marulić's books published in the 1510s is also the first time a literary work used the term "psychology". More recently, Pope John Paul II quoted from a Marulić poem during his 1998 apostolic visit to Solin, Croatia.

== Biography ==
Marulić was born on 18 August 1450 into the Croatian nobility in Split, Dalmatia. He was the first of seven children. The palazzo in which he was born still stands on Papalić Street in Split. His father, Nikola Marulić, was descended from the Pečenić family (Pecinić, Picinić, Pezzini in Italian). Marulić came from a 15th century branch of the family whose founder was named Petar, and who only began calling themselves Marulić, Marulus or De Marulis, in the 15th century. His mother, Dobrica de Albertis, was a member of the Italian nobility.

Marko Marulić identified himself primarily as a citizen of Split and, secondly, as a Dalmatian. On the title pages of his books, he consistently signed as a native of Split.

Very little is known about his life, and the few facts that remain are often unreliable. It is certain that he attended a school in Split run by the Italian Renaissance humanist scholar Tideo Acciarini (1430–1490). Marulić's education is known also to have included instruction in the Greek language by Hieronymus Genesius Picentinus. Although his library later contained many textbooks on the language, Marulić read and spoke it imperfectly and only rarely used Greek words.

After completing school, Marulić is believed to have studied law at Padua University, after which he spent much of his life in his home town. His star-crossed love affair with a Split noblewoman ended when her father, the commander of the city's Venetian military garrison, allegedly buried her alive. A grieving Marulić lived for about two years as a postulant at a monastery on the island of Šolta, in the Adriatic Sea. Returning to Split, Marulić practiced law, serving as a judge, examiner of notarial entries and executor of wills. Owing to his work, he became the most distinguished member of Split's humanist circle.

Marulić's Evangelistarium ("Evangelistary"), a moral and theological compendium of Old and New Testament texts, was first published in 1487. The book was later republished by Italian Jewish publisher Gershom Soncino at Pisa and a copy of that edition was purchased by the German humanist scholar and Hebraist Johann Reuchlin in 1492. In 1519, another edition of the "Evangelistary" was published by Sebastian Münster.

Between 1496 and 1499, Marulić worked on a compendium of Christian morality, entitled De institutione bene vivendi per exempla sanctorum ("Instruction on How to Lead a Virtuous Life Based on the Examples of Saints"). According to Latinist and Classicist Edward Mulholland, Marulić's primary model for De institutione was the Memorable Deeds and Sayings of Valerius Maximus. Maximus had intended in the writing of his book, "to spare those who want to learn the lessons of history the trouble of prolonged researches" and accordingly organized the nine books of his volume, "to illustrate a particular virtue or vice", and it became a widely used textbook in Medieval and Renaissance Europe, both of rhetoric and as, "a gallery of practical moral instruction."

In addition to Old and New Testament examples, Marulić also drew upon the writings of St Jerome, Gregory the Great, Eusebius of Caesarea, John Cassian, the lives of the saints, and other Ecclesiastical writers.

Marulić's De institutione was first published in Latin at Venice in 1507 and became well known in the Germanosphere when Adam Petri reprinted it at Basel in 1513. The compendium was widely and repeatedly reprinted and translated into many vernacular languages, which established Marulić's fame throughout Europe.

Occasionally Marulić visited Venice (to trade) and Rome (to celebrate the year 1500).

According to his friend and early biographer Franjo Božičević, "for nearly forty years he sweated, shut up with the Muses, in divine volumes, nocturnal study, vigils, fasting, a hair shirt, prayers and rough floggings, not without harsh penance day and night."

He was a great admirer of the late medieval religious movement known as Devotio Moderna. By 1509, Marulić had finished translating Thomas à Kempis' The Imitation of Christ, a highly important literary and devotional work of the movement, from Medieval Latin into Croatian. His translation, however, remained unpublished until 1989.

His friend and fellow humanist Dmine Papalić found an old volume of local history composed in the Illyrian language and in the Early Cyrillic alphabet. At his friend's urging, Marulić both paraphrased and translated the volume into Latin as Regum Dalmatiae et Croatiae gesta ("The Deeds of the Kings of Dalmatia and Croatia"), as he completed Quinquaginta parabole ("Fifty Parables"), which is, according to Edward Mulholland, "Modeled after the parables of the New Testament, they consist in moral lessons in elegant Latin prose drawn from simple stories". Both books were first published in 1510. He finished writing The Life of St. Jerome in 1513. The following year, he completed Carmen de doctrina Domini nostri Iesu Christi pendentis in cruce ("Poem about the Teaching of Our Lord Jesus Christ Hanging on the Cross"), which has usually been published as part of De institutione bene vivendi and which remains his most famous work of Christian poetry in Latin.

In 1517, Marulić finished his epic poem the Davidiad, which was considered lost for more than 400 years, only rediscovered in 1952, and published for the first time in 1954.

Similarly to both Catholic and Protestant humanists of the same era, Marulić used The Davidiad to preach a multilayered interpretation of the Old Testament, as pre-figuring the foundation of Christianity through the later events described in the New Testament. For example, Marulić compared David to Jesus Christ, King Saul to Caiaphas, the Pharisees, and the Sanhedrin, while comparing Goliath to the Devil. Marulić also used his description of David and his warriors eating the Bread of the Presence while fleeing from King Saul an opportunity to praise the Catholic doctrine of the Real Presence in the Blessed Sacrament. Furthermore, Marulić's study of the Hebrew language was just as often on display in the Davidiad; as, despite the difficulties he routinely faced in fitting Hebrew words into the rhythm of Latin dactylic hexameter, he regularly made humorous comments about how very well the etymology of Hebrew personal names fit the character or appearance of their bearers.

According to Edward Mulholland, "Most early modern poets chose as their heroes either ancient historical characters - Petrarch's Africa (written 1339-43, first published in Venice in 1501) on the Second Punic War showing the lead - or medieval figures such as Charlemagne in Ugolino Verino's Carlias (1480), or, most frequently, contemporary rulers. Marulić was the very first author to write a Neo-Latin Biblical poem, and he would remain unique in having found his inspiration in the Old Testament. Though certainly a Dalmatian patriot, Marulić did not choose to write a national epic. He is retelling the Biblical story first and foremost, but from the fullness of his multifaceted persona as, in Baumann's words, "a Croat, a humanist, a conservative Catholic, an intellectual and a patrician of Split."

Marulić wrote De humilitate et gloria Christi ("On the Humility and Glory of Christ") and An Account of Illustrious Men of the Old Testament the following year.

His final works were De ultimo Christi judicio ("On the Last Judgment of Christ") and Judita, Marulić's Christian work of epic poetry retelling the Book of Judith in the Croatian language, which he produced between 1520 and 1522. The latter, which also drew very heavily upon the Italian poetry of Dante Alighieri and Petrarch, earned Marulić the title "Father of Croatian literature."

Upon completing the poem on 22 April, which is still celebrated in Croatia as National Book Day (hr), Marulić wrote to a friend, "See it and you will say that the Slavonic language also has its Dante."

Marko Marulić died in Split on 5 January 1524 and was buried in the Church of St. Francis in the historic city center.

Marulić's Liber de laudibus Herculis ("A Book in Praise of Hercules"), in which he, "lets the followers of Hercules, the titan of the pagans, compete with the titan of the Christians, that is, Jesus Christ, who, of course, is ultimately the victor", was posthumously published in 1524. It is also known under the title Dialogus de Hercule a Christicolis superato ("The Dialogue about Hercules, Who was Surpassed by Those Who Worship Christ").

According to Edward Mulholland, "In it he makes the argument that one who has conquered beasts and monsters, as Hercules did, is not as strong as one who has mastered himself, which is the ideal of every Christian. But Marulić also shares his thoughts on the use of mythology and epic. The dialogue is between a theologian and a poet. The question underlying the dialogue seems to be which way is the most secure to arrive at the truth... For Marulić, as Elisabeth von Erdmann points out, pagan myth and poetry gained a certain legitimacy when employed in the service of theology."

== Legacy ==
During the 16th and 17th century, Marulić's three most popular and most widely read works were De institutione bene vivendi per exempla sanctorum ("Instruction on How to Lead a Virtuous Life Based on the Examples of Saints"), Evangelistarium ("Evangelistary"), and Quinquaginta parabole ("Fifty Parables"). By 1680, these three books had been republished more than eighty times not only in the original Latin, but also in many European vernacular languages, including Italian, German, French, Spanish, Portuguese, Czech, Flemish, and even Icelandic. For this reason, Marulić is considered one of the most dynamic and influential theological and devotional writers of the Renaissance.

The British Library still has King Henry VIII's Latin-language copy of Marulić's Evangelistiarium, a book that was read in English and recommended to the King by Sir Thomas More. Extensive margin notes in the King's own hand prove that Marulić's book was a major source for the Defence of the Seven Sacraments, Henry's polemic against Lutheranism.

De institutione bene vivendi per exempla sanctorum ("Instruction on How to Lead a Virtuous Life Based on the Examples of Saints"), a voluminous book of Christian morality based on examples from the Bible and concluding with the Latin poem Carmen de doctrina Domini nostri Iesu Christi pendentis in cruce ("Poem about the Teaching of Our Lord Jesus Christ Hanging on the Cross"), was first published in 1506 in Venice. The final poem, which remains Marulić's most famous work of Latin Christian poetry, was published separately in a standalone volume at Erfurt by the German Renaissance humanist and Cistercian abbot Henricus Urbanus in 1514.

De Institutione was seen by Catholic priests during the Counter-Reformation as a rich source of stories for use during their preaching and was "considered the work most useful for Catholics in the defence of their ancestral Faith." De Institutione is further known to have had an enormous influence upon St Francis Xavier; it was the only book, aside from the Roman Breviary, that he carried with him and constantly re-read during his missionary work in Portuguese India. St. Francis Xavier's copy of the book was returned to Spain after his death and was long treasured in Madrid as a second class relic by the Society of Jesus. Writing in 1961, Marulić scholar Ante Kadić announced that recent inquiries about the volume had come up empty and that he believed the Saint's copy must have been destroyed during the May 1931 arson attack by Spanish Republicans against the Jesuit monastery in Madrid. Further research, however, will be needed to determine whether excerpts from De institutione were translated into Japanese by Paul Yôhô-ken (1510–1599) and his son and published at Nagasaki by the Jesuits as Sanctos no go-sagyô no uchi nukigakkan dai-ichi ("Extracts from the Acts of the Saints") in 1591.

Due to Marulić having taken a stance in the fourth chapter of the Instituto in favour of the then controversial ethical doctrine of mental reservation, namely, "that lying may sometimes be licit, although always undesirable", the same volume was temporarily placed upon the Index of Forbidden Books and copies were burned at Siena in 1564.

While imprisoned for recusancy in the Tower of London under Queen Elizabeth I, St. Philip Howard, who was later canonised in 1970 by Pope Paul VI as one of the Forty Martyrs of England and Wales, wrote a translation into Elizabethan English verse of Marulić's poem Carmen de doctrina Domini nostri Iesu Christi pendentis in cruce ("A Dialogue Betwixt a Christian and Christ Hanging on the Crosse"). Howard also produced an English translation of John Justus of Landsberg's Alloquia Jesu Christi ad animam fidelem ("An Epistle in the Person of Jesus Christ to the Faithful Soule") during his imprisonment in the Tower, which was posthumously published at Antwerp, in the Spanish Netherlands (1595). St. Philip Howard's translation of Marulić's poem was published instead of a preface to the Antwerp edition and again, with updated English orthography, as part of the March/April 2022 issue of the literary magazine, St. Austin Review. During the parallel literary and cultural flowering known as the Spanish Golden Age, same dialogue poem by Marulić was similarly translated into an immortal work of Castilian Spanish verse by the Augustinian friar Luis de León.

On October 4, 1998, Pope John Paul II quoted from Marulić's Carmen de doctrina Domini nostri Iesu Christi pendentis in cruce ("Poem about the Teaching of Our Lord Jesus Christ Hanging on the Cross") during an apostolic visit to Solin, Croatia, "One of your poets has written, Felix qui semper vitae bene computat usum ('Happy is he who always puts his life to good use.') It is vital to choose true values, not those which pass, to choose genuine truth, not half-truths and pseudo-truths. Do not trust those who promise you easy solutions. Nothing great can be built without sacrifice."

In 2024, Edward Mulholland, a Latinist and Classicist from the faculty of Benedictine College in Atchison, Kansas, published the first complete English translation of the Davidiad in un-rhymed iambic pentameter. The work, which also includes an English translation of the Tropologica Expositio, was released as an entry in LYSA Publishers's "LYNX" book series dedicated to neo-Latin texts.

In his introduction Mulholland explained, "The translation of a Vergilian epic owes much to translators of Vergil." Mulholland according expressed gratitude to the previous translators of the Aeneid, especially Gavin Douglas, John Dryden, Robert Fagles, and Robert Fitzgerald. Mulholland also explained that he had chosen to follow the existing convention that, "English epic poetry ... uses alliteration more often than Latin does." For this reason, Mulholland decided to publish his translation side by side with the Latin original, so that those able to read both languages could compare them to one another.

In 2023, Mulholland's translation of Book XIV had been named an honorable mention during the British Centre for Literary Translation's John Dryden Translation Competition.

== Writing ==
The central figure of the humanist circle in Split, Marulić was inspired by the Bible, ancient writers and Christian hagiographies. The main topics of his writings were Christian theological by nature. He wrote many poems, discussions on theology and Christian ethics, stories and epic poetry. He wrote in three languages: Renaissance Latin (more than 80% of his surviving opus), Croatian and Italian (three letters and two sonnets are preserved).

=== Croatian works ===
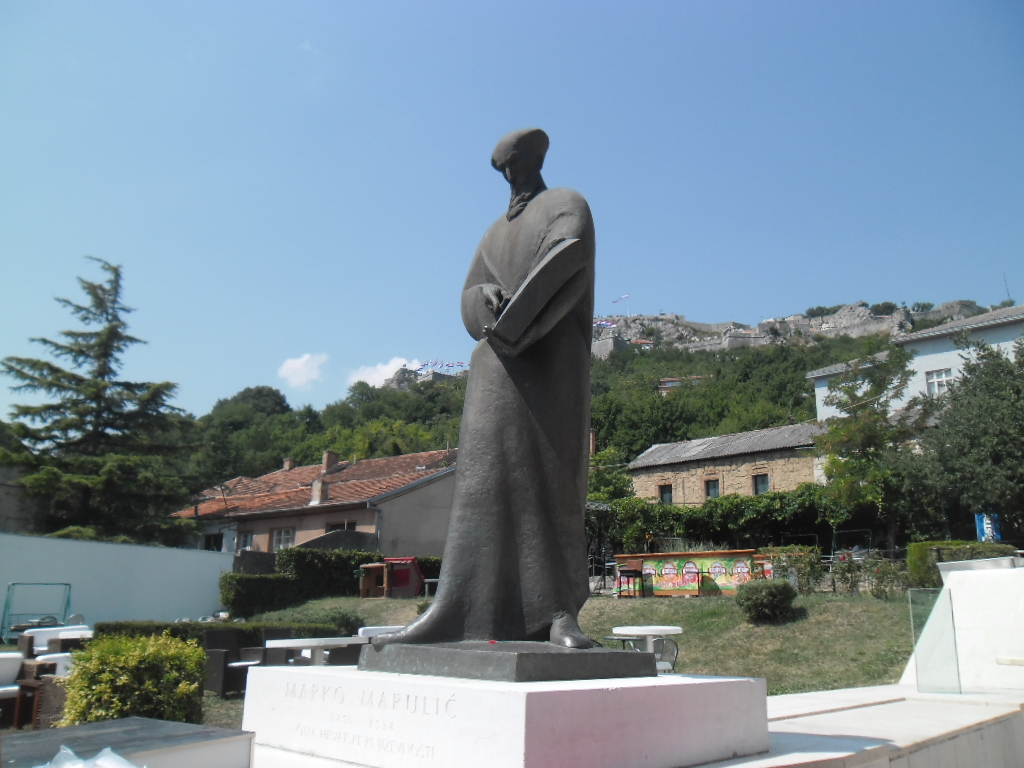
Monument in Knin.

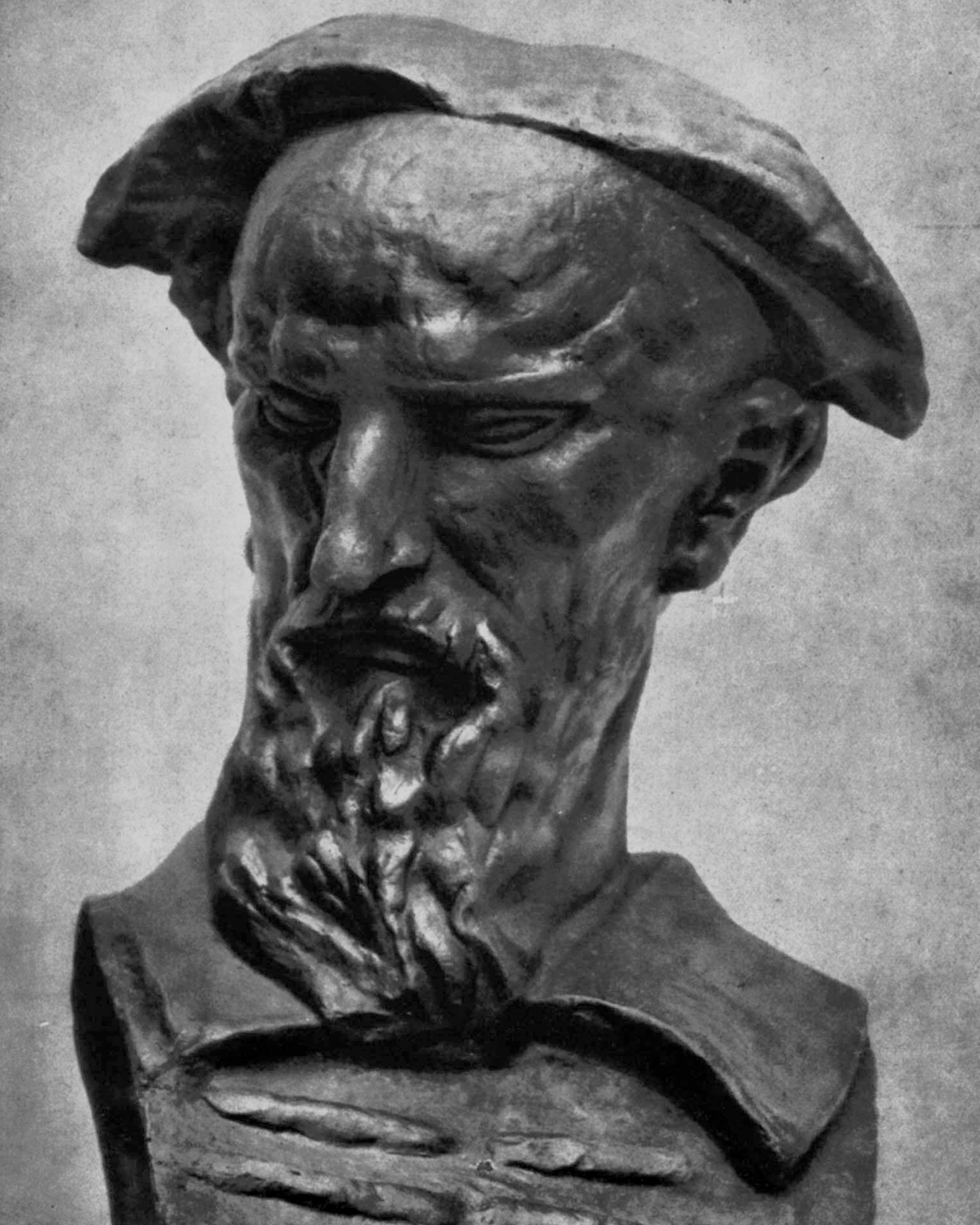
Bust of Marko Marulić by Ivan Meštrović in Split.

In his Croatian-language works, Marulić achieved a permanent status and position that has remained uncontested. His central Croatian oeuvre, the epic poem Judita (Libar Marca Marula Splichianina V chomse sdarsi Istoria Sfete udouice Iudit u uersih haruacchi slosena chacho ona ubi uoiuodu Olopherna Posridu uoische gnegoue i oslodobi puch israelschi od ueliche pogibili) written in 1501 and published in Venice in 1521, is based on the Biblical tale from a Deuterocanonical Book of Judith, written in Čakavian dialect, his mother tongue, and described by him as u versi haruacchi slozhena ("arranged in Croatian stanzas"). His other works in Croatian are:

- Suzana ("Susanna") – a Biblical poem in 780 verses, based on the account from the Book of Daniel of the Babylonian Jewish woman of the same name who was falsely accused of adultery and how her innocence was proven and she was saved from death by stoning by the timely intervention and interrogation of her accusers by the Prophet Daniel.
- Poklad i korizma (Carnival and Lent), Spovid koludric od sedam smrtnih grihov ("A Nun's Confession of the Seven Deadly Sins"), Anka satir (Anka: A Satire) – secular poetry, and poetry dedicated to his sister Bira
- Tužen'je grada Hjerosolima (Jerusalem's Lament) – anti-Turkish laments
- Molitva suprotiva Turkom ("A Prayer Against the Turks") – poem in 172 doubly rhymed dodecasyllablic stanzas of anti-Turkish theme, written between 1493 and 1500. The poem contains the hidden acrostic Solus deus potes nos liberare de tribulatione inimicorum nostrorum Turcorum sua potentia infinita, "Only God with his infinite might can save us from the misery of our enemies, the Turks", discovered by Luko Paljetak. It is believed to show the influence of Juraj Šižgorić's Elegija o pustošenju Šibenskog polja and the medieval song Spasi, Marije, tvojih vjernih from Tkonski miscellany. Marulić's poem in turn has influenced Zoranić's Planine – the first Croatian novel, in which ganka pastira Marula alludes to Turks, and also to Petar Lučić and his work Molitva Bogu protiv Turkom, and Primož Trubar's Pjesni zuper Turke.

American historian John Van Antwerp Fine, Jr. emphasizes that Marulić belongs to a group of humanists and clerics placed in the "Croat" camp who, at least at the time they wrote their texts, did not seem to have a Croatian ethnic identity. A critical review of Fine's work highlighted subjective conclusions. Neven Budak of the University of Zagreb noted "ideological prejudices", "omission of historical facts" and "preconceived conclusions" due to Fine's alleged personal bias regarding the former Yugoslavia and its various ethnic groups.

=== Latin works ===
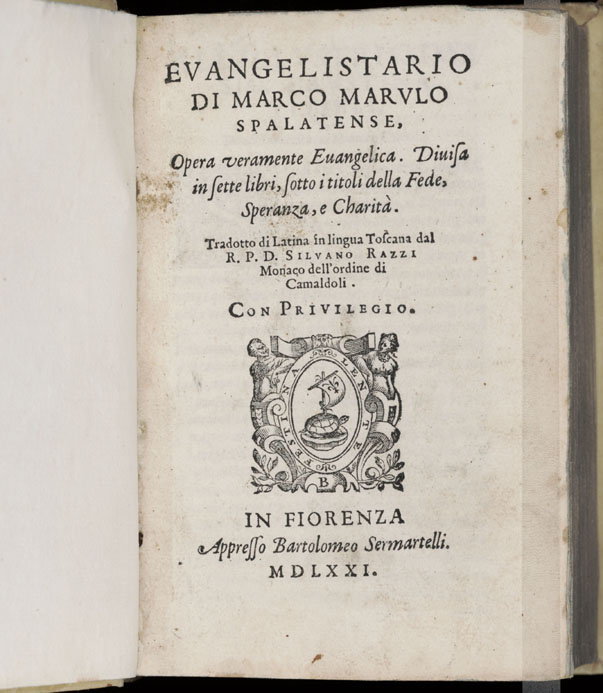
Cover sheet of Marulić's Evangelistarium, 1571 Tuscan-language edition, translated by Silvano Razzi from Latin original.

Marulić's European fame rested mainly on his works written in Renaissance Latin which were repeatedly re-published.

His Psichiologia de ratione animae humanae, written between 1510 and 1517, contains the earliest known literary reference to the term psychology.

In 1517, Marulić completed the Davidiad an epic poem which retold the Old Testament story of King David in Virgilian Latin with multiple references to Greek and Roman mythology. In addition to the small portions that attempt to recall Homer, the Davidiad is heavily modeled upon Virgil's Aeneid. Indeed, the work was so heavily indebted to the Aeneid that Marulić's contemporaries called him the "Christian Virgil from Split." Serbian-American philologist Miroslav Marcovich also detects "the influence of Ovid, Lucan, and Statius" in the work.

The Davidiad was considered lost by 1567 and long remained so. After a search lasting nearly two centuries by Croatian literary scholars at libraries and archives throughout Europe, Marulic's original manuscript (Ms. T) resurfaced at the Turin National University Library in 1922. News of its existence and the fact that it had never previously been published was spread throughout Classical academia by Carlo Dionisotti in 1952. The editio princeps was published by Josip Badalić of the Yugoslav Academy of Sciences and Arts in 1954, but this work "proved to be a failure," as whole verses were left out and many words were misread by the editor. Several years later, in 1957, Miroslav Marcovich overcame many of the difficulties that plagued Badalić's work and produced a more usable critical edition. Latinist Veljko Gortan eventually corrected around 50 instances of misread words and published his own critical edition in 1974. A literary translation of the Davidiad into Croatian hexameters was made by Branimir Glavačić and published alongside the Latin original as part of Veljko Gortan's edition in 1974.

Marulić was active in the struggles against the Ottoman Turks who were invading the Croatian lands at that time. To this end, he wrote a Latin Epistola to Pope Adrian VI and begged for assistance in the fight against the Ottomans. In his epigram In discordiam principium Christianorum ("Against Discord between the Princes of the Christians"), Marulić denounced the monarchs of Europe for warring among themselves at a time when the Sultan of the Ottoman Empire and the janissaries were invading Christendom.

=== Glasgow codex ===
A Marulić manuscript found in Glasgow University Library threw new light on his work and persona. It was discovered in 1995 by Darko Novaković, who stated that, in comparison with Marulić's known carmina minora, the poems in the codex introduce three thematic novelties. Unexpectedly vehement, satirical epigrams are featured and the intensity of his satirical impulse is startling, even in such conventional poems as epitaphs. Three poems reveal his love of animals. The greatest revelation are the verses which show Marulić as the author of love poems. This aspect represents the most serious challenge to the traditional picture of the poet: the last epigram in the collection is a true Priapeum marked with lascivious ambiguity.

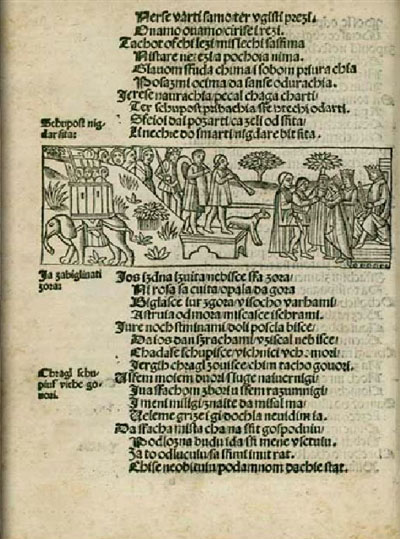
Marko Marulić's illustration for Judita, a page from second edition, Zadar 1522.

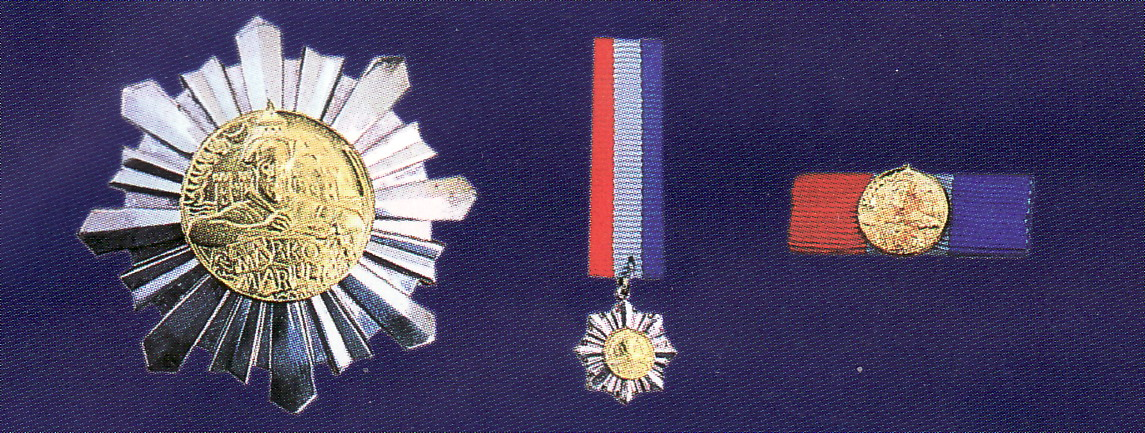
The Order of Danica Hrvatska with the face of Marko Marulić is a Croatian state decoration awarded for special merit in culture.

== Visual artist ==
According to Fisković, Marulić was an accomplished illustrator. In his will he left to his sister a book he illustrated and conceived. The second edition of Judita, prepared by Zadar publisher Jerolim Mirković, dated 30 May 1522, is adorned with nine woodcuts, the last of which is signed "M". It is assumed that the illustrations were created by Marulić himself.

== Commemoration ==
Marulić's portrait was depicted on the obverse of the Croatian 500 kuna banknote, issued in 1993.

The Croatian state decoration awarded for special merit in culture, the Order of Danica Hrvatska, is ornamented with the face of Marko Marulić.

The Festival of Croatian Drama in Split – 'Festival Marulićevi dani' (Festival of Marulić days) – is named after Marulić and gives annual MARUL awards.

The revue Marulić (hr) and the journal Colloquia Maruliana are named after him. Marulianum is a scientific centre of Split Literary Circle dedicated to research on Marulić.

By the decree of Sabor in 1996, 22 April is commemorated in Croatia as the Day of the Croatian Book (hr) in tribute to Marulić and his Judita. Sabor declared 2021 in Croatia as a Year of Marko Marulić and Year of reading in Croatia, marking 500 years since the publication of Judita. The Croatian government declared 2024 as the Year of Marko Marulić in memorial of the 500th anniversary of his death.
