= Aspasius of Byblos =

Ancient Greek sophist

Aspasius of Byblos (Ancient Greek: Ἀσπάσιος ὁ Βύβλιος) was a sophist of Ancient Greece who according to the Suda was a contemporary of the sophists Adrianus and Aelius Aristides, and who consequently lived in the reign of the emperors Marcus Aurelius and Commodus, around 180 CE. He was a pupil of Apsines (this was the 2nd-century Athenian sophist Apsines, and not Apsines of Gadara or the 4th century sophist Apsines).

He is mentioned among the commentators on Demosthenes and Aeschines; and in the Suda several other works are ascribed to him, including works on Byblos (one of the rare Greek-written histories of the Phoenicians), meditations, rhetoric, declamations, an encomium on the emperor Hadrian, and some other writings. All of these are lost, with the exception of a few extracts from his commentaries.

Some scholars have suggested that some works previously ascribed to Apsines were actually the works of this person. He may also be the same person as Aspasius of Tyre.
