= Jan Bake =

Dutch philologist and critic (1787–1864)

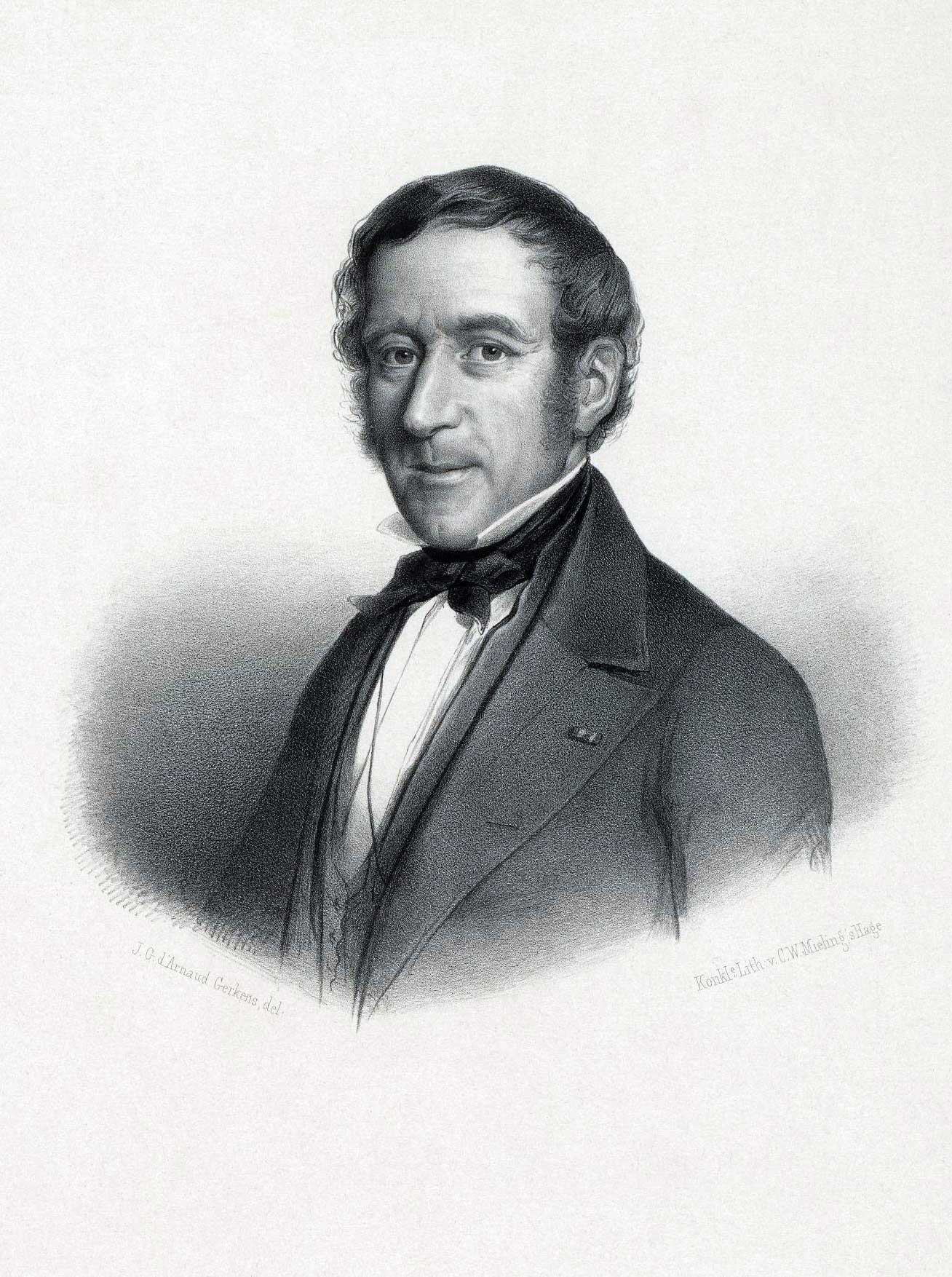
John Bake

Jan Bake (1 September 1787 – 26 March 1864) was a Dutch philologist and critic. He was born in Leiden, and from 1817 to 1854 he was professor of Greek and Roman literature at the university.

His principal works are:-

- Posidonii Rhodii Reliquiae Doctrinae (1810)
- Cleomedis Circularis Doctrina de Sublimitate (1820)
- Bibliotheca Critica Nova (1825–1831)
- Scholica Hypomnemata (1837–1862), a collection of essays dealing mainly with Cicero and the Attic orators
- Cicero, De Legibus (1842) and De Oratore (1863)
- Apsinis et Longini Rhethorica (1849).

His biography was written (in Dutch) by his pupil Bakhuizen van der Brink (1865); for an appreciation of his services to classical literature see L Müller, Geschichte der klassischen Philologie in den Nederlanden (1869).
