= Alcestis Barcinonensis =

Ancient mythological poem

Alcestis Barcinonensis ("Alcestis of Barcelona") was a poem, estimated to have been written during the second half of the 4th century. The poem consisted of at least 124 Latin hexameters, and retold the mythical story of Alcestis, princess of Iolcus, who died for the sake of her husband Admetus. It was apparently adapted from the play Alcestis, which had been written by Euripides in 438 BC. The poem was written on four papyrus leaves (papyri Barcinonenses inv. no. 158ab, 159ab, 160ab and 161a) d based on the calligraphic elements (handwriting) which included an early half-uncial with cursive elements, and inserted into a codex mixtus at some later point in time. The editio princeps was published by the Catalan priest and papyrologist Ramon Roca-Puig on 18 October 1982. The papyrus leaves are now in the possession of the foundation Sant Lluc Evangelista founded by Roca-Puig and located in Barcelona (in Latin: Barcino, hence the specifying adjective).

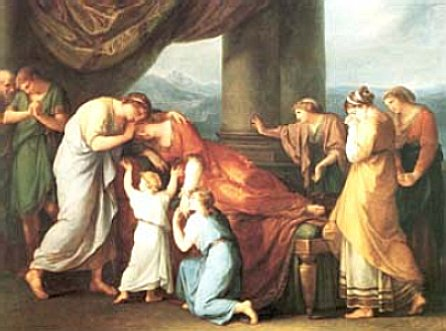
The death of Alcestis

== Discovery and publication ==
The Alcestis occupies folia 33–36 of the codex mixtus. It is preceded by Cicero’s Catilinarians 1 and 2 (folia 1–24a), a Latin psalmus responsorius (folia 24b–28a) and a Greek liturgical text (folia 29b–32). The dating goes back to E. A. Lowe, who dates the psalmus responsorius to the second half of the fourth century and, copied by the same hand, the Alcestis as well.

The decipherment and interpretation of the papyrus was carried out at four places simultaneously: by Wolfgang Dieter Lebek at the University of Cologne, by Peter J. Parsons, Robin G. M. Nisbet, and G. O. Hutchinson at the University of Oxford, by Miroslav Marcovich at the University of Illinois at Urbana-Champaign and by Vincenzo Tandoi at the University of Foggia. Dating of the poem was made by E. A. Lowe, who determined that the work was likely written during the second half of the 4th century CE.

== Contents and structure ==
The poem falls into five parts, each comprising two or three sections. In lines 1–20 Admetus, husband of Alcestis, learns from Apollo that he shall die soon, unless he finds somebody willing to die in his place. Therefore, Admetus turns to his father (21–42) and to his mother (42–70), but both deny his request. Only Alcestis is ready to swap her life for his, but asks him not to remarry after her death (71–103). The end of the poem describes the death of Alcestis (104–124).

Part	Lines	Contents	Number of sections
1	1–20	Dialogue between Admetus and Apollo	2
2	21–42	Dialogue between Admetus and Pheres	2
		The agon between Clymene and Alcestis:	
3	42–70	Clymene’s rhesis	3
4	71–103	Alcestis' antirhesis	3
5	104–124	The last day and the death of the heroine	2

== Literary history ==
The Alcestis Barcinonensis belongs to the late Latin genre of poetical exercises in versified mythological ethopoeia. A parallel is to be found in the poem Alcesta of the Anthologia Latina (I, no. 15 Riese) comprising 162 hexameters. Comparable pieces of this kind of late Latin poetry connected to the imperial court are the mythological exercises of Dracontius such as Hylas and in particular Claudian’s mythological epic De raptu Proserpinae.

== Editions and further reading ==
In chronological order.

=== Editions and commentaries ===
- Roca-Puig, Ramon (1982). Alcestis. Hexamètres Llatins. Papyri Barcinonenses Inv. no 158–161. Barcelona: Grafos. – Editio princeps.
- Lebek, Wolfgang Dieter (1983). "Das neue Alcestis-Gedicht der Papyri Barcinonenses". Zeitschrift für Papyrologie und Epigraphik. 52: 1–29. JSTOR 20183849. – Critical edition with commentary and German translation.
- Marcovich, Miroslav (1984). "Alcestis Barcinonensis". Illinois Classical Studies. 9: 111–134. – Critical edition with introduction and English translation.
- Tandoi, Vincenzo (1984). "Anonymi Carmen de Alcestide nuper repertum". Quaderni dell'Associazione Italiana di Cultura Classica di Foggia. 4: 3–12. – Critical edition.
  - Reprint: Tandoi, Vincenzo (2018). "Anonymi Carmen de Alcestide nuper repertum". Studi Classici e Orientali. 64: 545–556. JSTOR 26495477.
- Marcovich, Miroslav, ed. (1988). Alcestis Barcinonensis. Text and Commentary. Mnemosyne Suppl. 103. Leiden: E. J. Brill. ISBN 90-04-08600-5. – Critical edition with introduction, commentary, and English translation.
- Gärtner, Hans Armin (1988). "Alcestis Barcinoensis". In von Albrecht, Michael (ed.). Die römische Literatur in Text und Darstellung. Vol. 5. Kaiserzeit II. Von Tertullian bis Boethius. Stuttgart: Reclam. pp. 170–178. – Partial edition without apparatus, but with short introduction and German translation.
- Anonimo (1992). Nosarti, Lorenzo (ed.). L'Alcesti di Barcellona. Edizione e Saggi Universitari di Filologia Classica 51. Bologna: Pàtron. – Critical edition with introduction, commentary, and Italian translation.
  - Review by Harry M. Hine, in: The Classical Review (New Series) 49, 1999, 269–270.
- Nocchi Macedo, Gabriel, ed. (2014). L'Alceste de Barcelone (P.Monts. Roca inv. 158–161). Édition, traduction et analyse contextuelle d'un poème latin conservé sur papyrus. Papyrologica Leodiensia 3. Liège: Presses Universitaires de Liège.
  - Review by Hubert Zehnacker, in: Bryn Mawr Classical Review 2014.10.61.

=== Studies ===
- Peter J. Parsons, R. G. M. Nisbet, G. O. Hutchinson: Alcestis in Barcelona. In: Zeitschrift für Papyrologie und Epigraphik 52, 1983, 31–36.
- Jacques Schwartz: Le papyrus latin d’Alceste et l’oeuvre de Claudien. In: Zeitschrift für Papyrologie und Epigraphik 52, 1983, 37–.
- Vincenzo Tandoi: La nuova Alcesti di Barcellona. In: Disiecti membra poetae. Studi di poesia latina in frammenti. Band 1, Foggia 1984, 233–245.
- Christoph Schäublin: Zur Alcestis Barcinonensis. In: Museum Helveticum 41, 1984, 174–181.
- Geoffrey Harrison, Dirk Obbink: Vergil, Georgics I 36–39 and the Barcelona Alcestis. In: Zeitschrift für Papyrologie und Epigraphik 63, 1986, 75–81.
- Miroslav Marcovich: The Alcestis Papyrus Revisited. In: Zeitschrift für Papyrologie und Epigraphik 65, 1986, 39–57.
- Wolfgang Dieter Lebek: Die Alcestis Barcinonensis: Neue Konjekturen und Interpretationen. In: Zeitschrift für Papyrologie und Epigraphik 70, 1987, 39–48.
- Nicholas Horsfall: Alcestis Barcinonensis 67: Some metrical problems. In: Zeitschrift für Papyrologie und Epigraphik 77, 1989, 25–26, online (PDF).
- Wolfgang Dieter Lebek: Postmortale Erotik und andere Probleme der Alcestis Barcinonensis. In: Zeitschrift für Papyrologie und Epigraphik 76, 1989, 19–26, online (PDF).
- Kurt Smolak: § 549. Alcestis. In: Restauration und Erneuerung. Die lateinische Literatur von 284 bis 374 n. Chr. Hg. v. Reinhart Herzog (Handbuch der lateinischen Literatur der Antike, hg. v. Reinhart Herzog und Peter Lebrecht Schmidt, Fünfter Band). C. H. Beck, München 1989.
- Dimitrios Mantzilas: Reception and Genre Cross–Reference in Alcestis Barcinonensis. In: Graeco–Latina Brunensia 16, 2011, 2, 61–90, (online) (PDF).
- Anna Maria Wasyl, "Alcestis" barcelońska oraz centon "Alcesta". Późnoantyczne spojrzenie na mit i gatunek. Wydawnictwo Uniwersytetu Jagiellońskiego, Kraków 2018.
