= Mervin R. Dilts =

American classical scholar

- Occupation: Classical scholar

Academic background
- Education: Gettysburg College (BA 1960); Indiana University Bloomington (MA 1961); Indiana University Bloomington (PhD 1964)
- Alma mater: Indiana University
- Thesis: The Manuscript Tradition of Aelian’s Varia Historia and Heraclides’ Politiae with a Text of Heraclides (1964)
- Doctoral advisor: Aubrey Diller

Academic work
- Institutions: Knox College; University of Illinois; New York University; Lincoln College

Mervin Robert Dilts (born 26 February 1938) is an American classical scholar and emeritus professor at New York University.

== Biography ==
Born in Flemington, New Jersey, Dilts studied at Gettysburg College (BA, 1960) and at Indiana University Bloomington (MA, 1961; PhD, 1964), where he was advised by Aubrey Diller. He was assistant professor at Knox College and in 1965 moved to the University of Illinois Urbana-Champaign, where he worked with Alexander Turyn and, later, with Miroslav Marcovich. In 1969, he was promoted to associate professor. From 1971 to 1979 he was a financial trustee of the American Philological Association.

In 1979, Dilts became professor in classics at New York University, where he taught until his retirement. He is currently emeritus professor at NYU and Murray Fellow of Lincoln College, Oxford, where he patrons the Dilts-Lyell Research Fellowship in Greek Palaeography.

== Research activity ==
Dilts is primarily a textual critic, with special focus on Ancient Greek orators. He defended a dissertation on the manuscript tradition of Aelian's Varia Historia and Heraclides Lembus' Politiae, publishing the latter in 1971 and, in 1974, the former in the renowned Bibliotheca Teubneriana. Dilts published four further Teubner editions, being the two-volume scholia on Demosthenes, the scholia on Aeschines, and the critical edition of his speeches — in the latter case, completing a line of research started by his former advisor Diller.

In the 2000s, his four-volume critical edition of Demosthenes' speeches appeared in the Oxford Classical Texts, followed, in 2018, by the speeches of Antiphon and Andocides.

== Publications ==
- Aelianus, Cl. (1974). Dilts, M. R. (ed.). Varia Historia. Bibliotheca Teubneriana. Leipzig: B. G. Teubner.
- Aeschines (1997). Dilts, M. R. (ed.). Orationes. Bibliotheca Teubneriana. Stuttgart – Leipzig: B. G. Teubner. doi:10.1515/9783110953916. ISBN 978-3-598-71009-4.
- Antiphon; Andocides (2018). Dilts, M. R.; Murphy, D. J. (eds.). Orationes. OCT. Oxford: Clarendon Press. ISBN 9780199605477.
- Demosthenes (2002). Dilts, M. R. (ed.). Orationes. OCT. Vol. I. Oxford: Clarendon Press. ISBN 9780198721680.
- Demosthenes (2005). Dilts, M. R. (ed.). Orationes. OCT. Vol. II. Oxford: Clarendon Press. ISBN 9780198721697.
- Demosthenes (2007). Dilts, M. R. (ed.). Orationes. OCT. Vol. III. Oxford: Clarendon Press. ISBN 9780198721703.
- Demosthenes (2010). Dilts, M. R. (ed.). Orationes. OCT. Vol. IV. Oxford: Clarendon Press. ISBN 9780198721710.
- Dilts, M. R. (1964). The Manuscript Tradition of Aelian's Varia Historia and Heraclides' Politiae with a Text of Heraclides. Ann Arbor: University Microfilms Inc. — Dissertation.
- Dilts, M. R. (1965a). "Krumbacher on George Pisides". Byzantion. 35 (2): 612. JSTOR 44170161.
- Dilts, M. R. (1965b). "The Manuscript Tradition of Aelian's Varia Historia and Heraclides' Politiae". Transactions and Proceedings of the American Philological Association. 96: 57–72. doi:10.2307/283718. JSTOR 283718.
- Dilts, M. R. (1968). "A Fragment of Plutarch's Parallela Minora in Vatic. gr. 141". Scriptorium. 22 (2): 271. doi:10.3406/scrip.1968.3333.
- Dilts, M. R. (1971). "The Manuscripts of Appian's Historia Romana". Revue d'Histoire des Textes. 1 (1971): 49–71. doi:10.3406/rht.1971.1770.
- Dilts, M. R. (1974). "Demosthenic Scholia in Codex Laurentianus 59, 9". Transactions of the American Philological Association. 104: 97–102. doi:10.2307/2936082. JSTOR 2936082.
- Dilts, M. R. (1975). "The Manuscript Tradition of the Scholia Ulpiani on Demosthenis in Timocratem". Transactions of the American Philological Association. 105: 35–50. doi:10.2307/283932. JSTOR 283932.
- Dilts, M. R. (1979a). "Notes on Demosthenic MSS. Containing Scholia". Prometheus. 5 (3): 256–66. doi:10.14601/prometheus-19846 (inactive 2026-04-23).
- Dilts, M. R. (1979b). "Manuscripts of Scholia Ulpiani on Demosthenes, Orations 1, 3 and 4". Greek, Roman, and Byzantine Studies. 20 (1): 55–67.
- Dilts, M. R., ed. (1983). Scholia Demosthenica. Bibliotheca Teubneriana. Vol. I. Leipzig: B. G. Teubner. ISBN 978-3-322-00274-7.
- Dilts, M. R., ed. (1986). Scholia Demosthenica. Bibliotheca Teubneriana. Vol. II. Leipzig: B. G. Teubner. doi:10.1515/9783110949803. ISBN 978-3-598-71259-3.
- Dilts, M. R., ed. (1992). Scholia in Aeschinem. Bibliotheca Teubneriana. Stuttgart – Leipzig: B. G. Teubner. doi:10.1515/9783110953909. ISBN 978-3-11-095390-9.
- Dilts, M. R. (1994). "Hiatus in the Orations of Aeschines". The American Journal of Philology. 115 (3): 367–73. doi:10.2307/295364. JSTOR 295364.
- Dilts, M. R.; Kennedy, G. A., eds. (1997). Two Greek Rhetorical Treatises from the Roman Empire. Mnemosyne, Suppl. 168. Leiden: E. J. Brill. ISBN 9789004107281.
- Dilts, M. R.; Sosower, M. L.; Manfredi, A., eds. (1998). Librorum Graecorum Bibliothecae Vaticanae index a Nicolao De Maioranis compositus et Fausto Saboeo collatus anno 1533. Studi e Testi, 384. Città del Vaticano: Biblioteca Apostolica Vaticana. ISBN 8821006840.
- Heraclides Lembus (1971). Dilts, M. R. (ed.). Excerpta Politiarum. Greek, Roman and Byzantine Monographs, 5. Durham (NC): Duke University.

== Bibliography ==
- Decleva Caizzi, F. (1973). "Review of Heraclides Lembus 1971". Rivista Critica di Storia della Filosofia. 28 (4): 476. JSTOR 44021672.
- Diller, A. (1979). "The Manuscript Tradition of Aeschines' Orations". Illinois Classical Studies. 4: 34–64. JSTOR 23061133.
- Donnet, D. (1998). "Review of Aeschines 1997". L'Antiquité Classique. 67: 326. JSTOR 41659754.
- Dorandi, T. (2008). "Review of Demosthenes 2005". Mnemosyne. IV. 61 (1): 148–149. JSTOR 27736205.
- Edwards, M. J. (2007). "The OCT of Demosthenes II". The Classical Review. 57 (2): 301–302. JSTOR 4497542.
- Harding, P. (1972). "Review of Heraclides Lembus 1971". Phoenix. 26 (4): 414–415. doi:10.2307/1087607. JSTOR 1087607.
- Hillgruber, M. (1996). "Review of Dilts 1992". Gnomon. 68 (6): 484–486. JSTOR 27692290.
- Kinzl, K. H. (1973). "Review of Heraclides Lembus 1971". The Classical World. 66 (8): 497. doi:10.2307/4347931. JSTOR 4347931.
- Klebba, C. E., ed. (2002). "Dilts, Mervin R.". Directory of American Scholars. Vol. III (10th ed.). Farmington Hills (Michigan): Gale Group. p. 64. ISBN 0-7876-5010-2. ISSN 0070-5101.
- Kremmydas, C. (2010). "Review of Demosthenes 2007". Gnomon. 82 (2): 156–158. JSTOR 27809361.
- MacDowell, D. M. (1985). "Review of Dilts 1983". The Journal of Hellenic Studies. 105: 188. JSTOR 631551.
- MacDowell, D. M. (1993). "Review of Dilts 1992". The Classical Review. 43 (2): 245–246. JSTOR 713508.
- Marcovich, M. (1975). "Heraclidis Lembi Excerpta Politiarum". The American Journal of Philology. 96 (1): 16–18. doi:10.2307/293585. JSTOR 293585.
- Nachtergael, G. (1988). "Review of Dilts 1983". L'Antiquité Classique. 57: 356. JSTOR 41658073.
- Nývlt, P. (2020). "Review of Antiphon & Andocides 2018". Listy filologické. 143 (1–2): 225–232. JSTOR 27141400.
- Saerens, C. (2008). "Review of Demosthenes 2005". L'Antiquité Classique. 77: 370–372. JSTOR 41812990.
- Schenkeweld, D. M. (2004). "Review of Demosthenes 2002 and other Demosthenic books". Mnemosyne. IV. 57 (2): 228–237. JSTOR 4433549.
- Schubert, P. (2003). "Review of Demosthenes 2002". Museum Helveticum. 60 (4): 229. JSTOR 24825054.
- Schubert, P. (2006). "Review of Demosthenes 2005". Museum Helveticum. 63 (4): 217. JSTOR 44079627.
- Schubert, P. (2011). "Review of Demosthenes 2010". Museum Helveticum. 68 (2): 214. JSTOR 44081007.
- Schwartz, J. (1975). "Review of Aelianus 1974". L'Antiquité Classique. 44 (2): 725. JSTOR 41650856.
- Sosower, M. L. (2020). "Aubrey Diller". dbcs.rutgers.edu.
- Trewett, J. (2005). "The New OCT of Demosthenes". The Classical Review. 55 (1): 50–53. JSTOR 3662264.
- Wartelle, A. (1995). "Review of Dilts 1992". Revue des Études Grecques. 108 (1): 249. JSTOR 44259797.
- Weißenberger, M. (2001). "Review of Aeschines 1997". Gnomon. 73 (1): 14–17. JSTOR 40493308.
