= Renaissance Latin =

Latin as spoken and written in the Renaissance

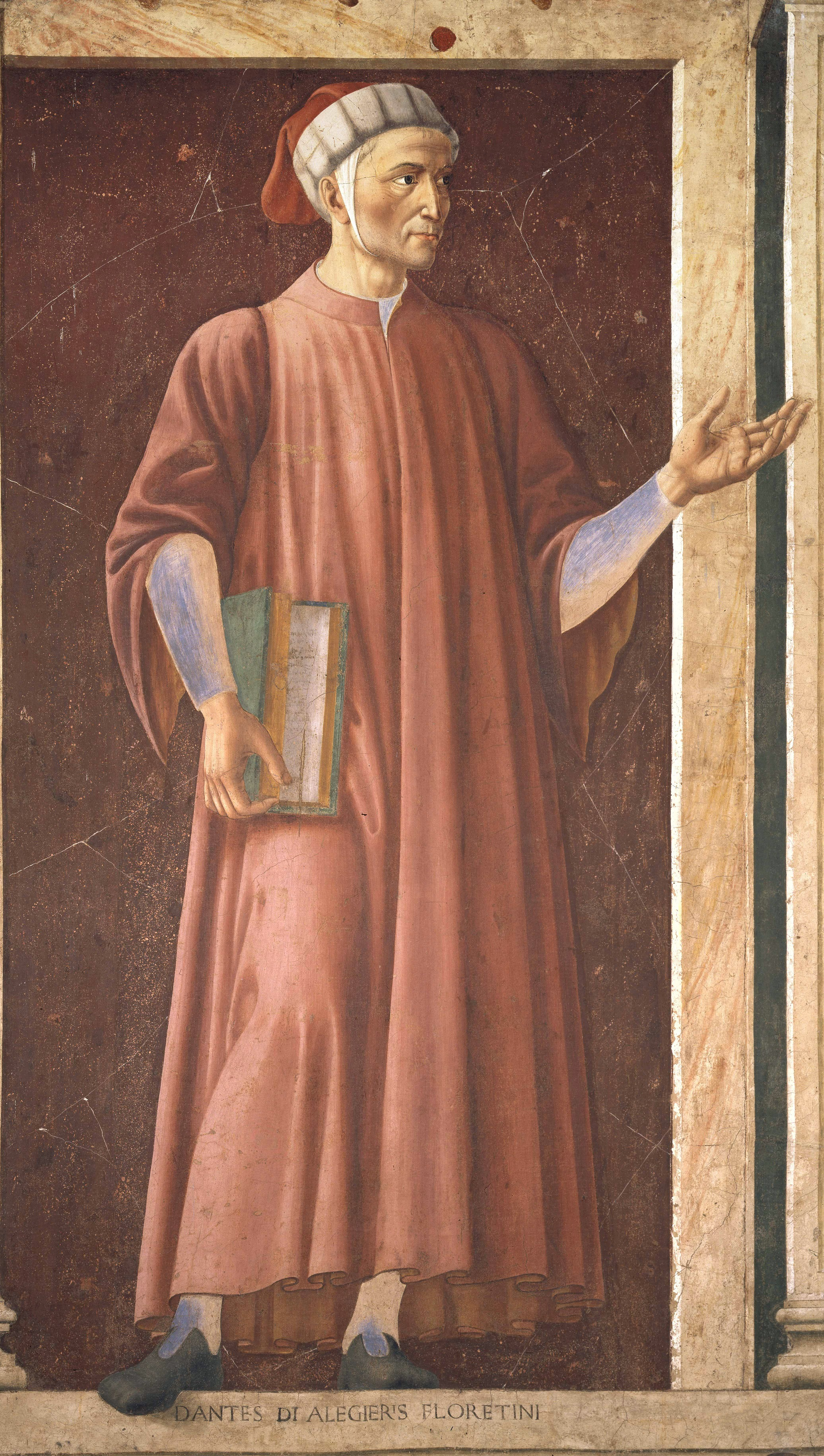
- Mural of Dante in the Uffizi Gallery, by Andrea del Castagno, c. 1450.
- Native to: No native speakers, used by the administrations and universities of numerous countries
- Region: Europe
- Era: Evolved from Medieval Latin in the 14th century; creating Neo-Latin used until present
- Language family: Indo-European: Italic; Latino-Faliscan; Latin; Renaissance Latin
- Early forms: Proto-Indo-European: Proto-Italic; Proto-Latino-Faliscan; Old Latin; Classical Latin; Late Latin; Medieval Latin
- Writing system: Latin alphabet

Official status
- Official language in: Most Roman Catholic countries
- Regulated by: The community of scholars at the earliest universities

Language codes
- ISO 639-3: –
- Glottolog: None

Renaissance Latin is a name given to the distinctive form of Literary Latin style developed during the European Renaissance of the fourteenth to fifteenth centuries, particularly by the Renaissance humanism movement. This style of Latin is regarded as the first phase of the standardised and grammatically "Classical" Neo-Latin which continued through the 16th–19th centuries, and was used as the language of choice for authors discussing subjects considered sufficiently important to merit an international (i.e., pan-European) audience.

== Ad fontes ==
Ad fontes ("to the sources") was the general cry of the Renaissance humanists, and as such their Latin style sought to purge Latin of the medieval Latin vocabulary and stylistic accretions that it had acquired in the centuries after the fall of the Roman Empire. They looked to golden age Latin literature, and especially to Cicero in prose and Virgil in poetry, as the arbiters of Latin style. They abandoned the use of the sequence and other accentual forms of metre, and sought instead to revive the Greek formats that were used in Latin poetry during the Roman period. The humanists condemned much of the large body of medieval Latin literature as "Gothic"—for them, a term of abuse—and believed instead that ancient Latin from the Roman period had to form the basis for judging what was a grammatical and accurate style of Latin.

Some 16th-century Ciceronian humanists also sought to purge written Latin of medieval developments in its orthography. They insisted, for example, that ae be written out in full wherever it occurred in classical Latin; medieval scribes often wrote e instead of ae. They were much more zealous than medieval Latin writers that t and c be distinguished; because the effects of palatalization made them homophones, medieval scribes often wrote, for example, eciam for etiam. Their reforms even affected handwriting; Humanists usually wrote Latin in a humanist minuscule script derived from Carolingian minuscule, the ultimate ancestor of most contemporary lower-case typefaces, avoiding the black-letter scripts used in the Middle Ages. This sort of writing was particularly vigilant in edited works, so that international colleagues could read them more easily, while in their own handwritten documents the Latin is usually written as it is pronounced in the vernacular. Therefore, the first generations of humanists did not dedicate much care to the orthography till the late sixteenth and seventeenth century. Erasmus proposed that the various traditional pronunciations of Latin current at the time be abolished in favour of his reconstructed version of classical Latin pronunciation, even though one can deduce from his works that he himself used one of the traditional ("ecclesiastical") pronunciations.

The humanist plan to remake Latin was largely successful, at least in education. Schools taught the humanistic spellings, and encouraged the study of the texts selected by the humanists, to the large exclusion of later Latin literature. On the other hand, while humanist Latin was an elegant literary language, it became much harder to write books about law, medicine, science or contemporary politics in Latin while achieving the higher standards of grammatical accuracy and stylistical fluency. Scholar Jürgen Leonhardt noted how these high standards changed speakers' relationship with the language: "Whereas during the Middle Ages, Latin had an instrumental function in human communications and in peoples' understanding of the world, for the humanists, the act of mastering the language became a measure of human self-perfection. In the end, the most important difference between medieval and humanist Latin may well have been the time and effort to learn it."

== Renaissance Latin works and authors ==
=== 14th century ===
- 1359. Epistolæ familiares by Petrarch (1304–1374)
- 1360. Genealogia deorum gentilium by Giovanni Boccaccio (1313–1375)

=== 15th century ===
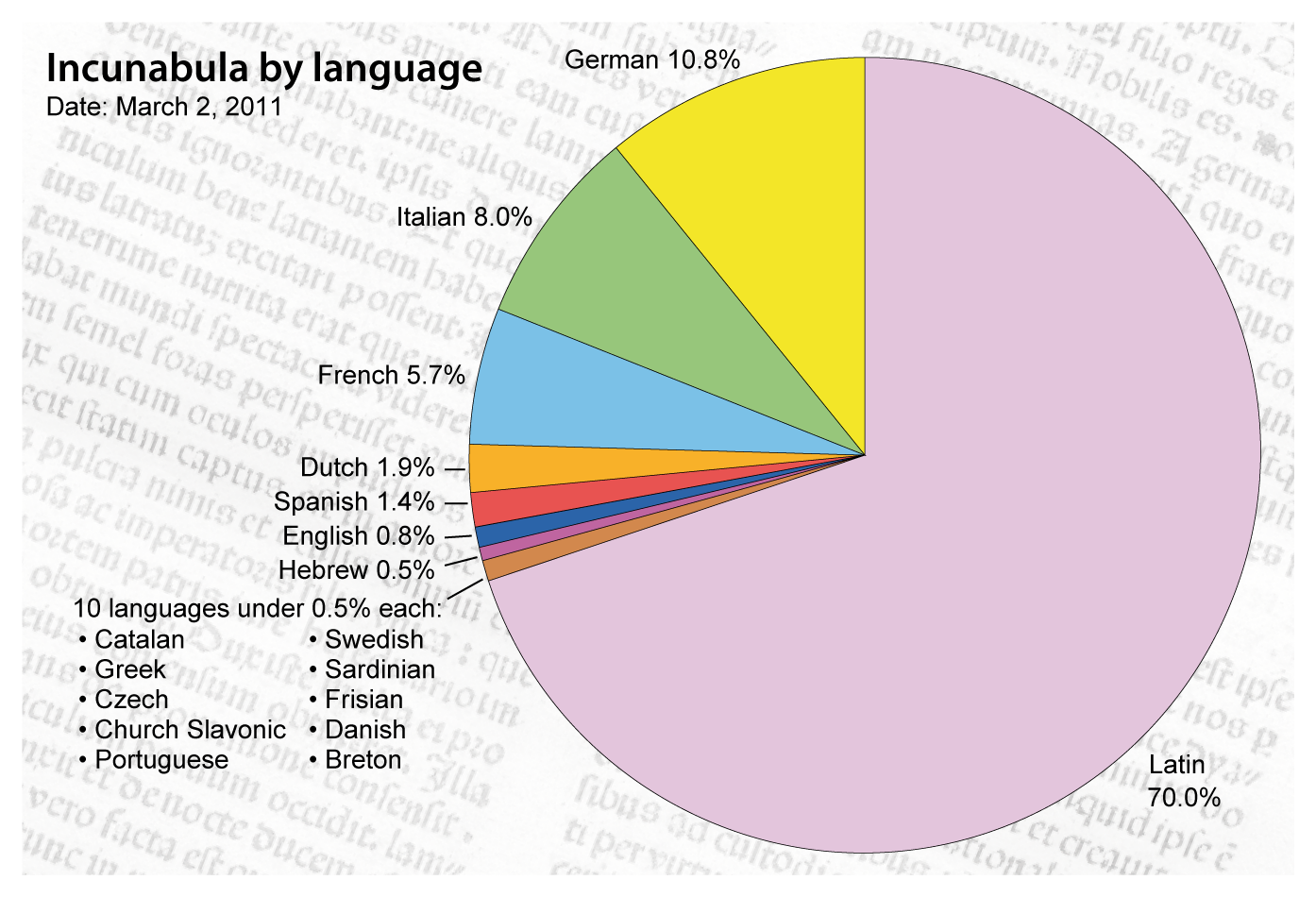
Incunables by language. Latin dominated printed book production in the 15th century by a wide margin.

- 1409. Flos Duellatorum by Fiore dei Liberi
- 1425. Hermaphroditus by Antonio Beccadelli (1394–1471)
- 1441. De elegantiis Latinæ linguæ by Lorenzo Valla (1406–1457)
- 1442. Historia Florentini populi by Leonardo Bruni (c. 1370–1444)
- 1444. Historia de duobus amantibus by Æneas Sylvius Piccolomini, Pope Pius II (1405–1464)
- 1452. De re ædificatoria by Leone Battista Alberti (1404–1472)
- 1471. Contra amores by Bartolomeo Platina (1421–1481)
- 1479. De inventione dialectica by Rodolphus Agricola (1444–1485)
- 1481. Introductiones Latinæ by Antonio de Nebrija (1441–1522)
- 1486. De hominis dignitate by Giovanni Pico della Mirandola (1463–1494)
- 1491. Nutricia by Poliziano (1454–1494)
- Theologia Platonica de immortalitate animæ by Marsilio Ficino (1433–1499)
- Francesco Filelfo (1398–1481)

=== 16th-century ===
- 1517. Marko Marulić (1450-1524) Davidiad, Psichiologia de ratione animae humanae

== See also ==
- Neo-Latin studies
- List of Neo-Latin authors
- New Ancient Greek
