= Polyeuctus of Sphettus =

4th century BC Athenian orator and political ally of Demosthenes

Polyeuctus
- Πολύευκτος
- Born: c. 400 BC; Athens
- Died: after 324 BC
- Occupation: Orator

Polyeuctus (Greek: Πολύευκτος, romanized: Polýeuktos; c. 400 – after 324 BC) was an Athenian orator and a political ally of his contemporary Demosthenes. He belonged to the deme of Sphettus.

== Life ==
Polyeuctus was born in Athens, in the deme of Sphettus. He collaborated with Demosthenes in opposing the pro-Macedonian party and in convincing the people to make war on Philip II's Macedon. In 343–342 BC he accompanied Demosthenes on his embassy to the cities of the Peloponnese. In 324 BC he was impeached together with Demosthenes over the Harpalus affair. In 321 BC he was ambassador to Arcadia.

Plutarch, reporting a statement by Aristo of Chios, writes that Polyeuctus once declared that Demosthenes was the greatest (μέγιστον) orator, but that it was Phocion who was the most influential (δυνατώτατον), since he conveyed the most meaning in the fewest words.

Polyeuctus was very corpulent, for which he was mocked by Phocion. The playwright Anaxandrides attacked his love of luxury. The orations of Polyeuctus are mentioned by Aristotle and Diogenes Laertius; and a fragment of an oration against Demades has been handed down by Apsines.
