= Aspasia (disambiguation) =

Aspasia was an Athenian woman and a friend of Pericles.

Aspasia may also refer to:

- Aspasia (journal), a journal of gender history
- Aspasia (plant), an orchid genus
- Aspásia, a city in São Paulo state, Brazil
- Aspasia Cruvellier Mirault (1800–1857), an American planter and landowner
- Aspasia Manos (1896–1972), wife of Alexander of Greece and the only modern Greek royal consort not styled as Queen
- Aspazija (1865–1943), Latvian poet and playwright
- Aspasia, the name of both the wife and daughter of Artaxerxes II of Persia
- Aspasia of Phocaea, wife of Cyrus the Younger
- Aspasia the Physician (fl. 1st century), ancient Greek physician who worked in obstetrics and gynecology
- 409 Aspasia, an asteroid
