= Psichiologia de ratione animae humanae =

Psichiologia de ratione animae humanae (Croatian: Psihologija, o naravi ljudske duše) is a work by Marko Marulić, a Croatian Renaissance humanist written between 1510 and 1517. It is the earliest known literary reference to "psychology" in the history of the discipline.
