= Miroslav Marcovich =

Serbian-American philologist and professor (1919–2001)

- Born: 18 March 1919; Belgrade, Kingdom of Yugoslavia
- Died: 14 June 2001 (aged 82); Urbana, Illinois, United States
- Education: University of Belgrade
- Known for: Editions of Heraclitus

Miroslav Marcovich (March 18, 1919 – June 14, 2001) was a Serbian-American philologist and university professor.

== Early life ==
Marcovich was born in Belgrade, Serbia. He studied at the University of Belgrade Faculty of Philosophy graduating in 1942. In 1943, he served as the assistant to George Ostrogorsky, an expert in Byzantine studies. He fought with the Yugoslav Partisans under Josip Broz Tito during World War 2 between 1944 and 1946. In 1953, he traveled to India where he began working at Visva-Bharati University.

== Career ==
In 1955, he moved to Mérida and worked as a professor of Ancient Greek and philosophy from 1955 to 1962 at the University of the Andes, Venezuela. In 1962, he taught at the University of Bonn invited by Hans Herter. Between 1963 and 1968, he taught at the University of Cambridge. When classical scholar and paleographer Alexander Turyn—Professor at the University of Illinois—retired in 1969, Marcovich moved to Urbana, where he was the Head of the Department of Classics (1973–77), and taught there until his retirement in 1989.

During those years he was a visiting professor at the University of Michigan, University of North Carolina, Trinity College, Dublin, and was an Albert Einstein Visiting Fellow in Tel Aviv.

Marcovich also founded the Illinois Classical Studies journal, and served as its editor for 12 years.

== Works ==
Marcovich focused his scholarship on textual criticism of philosophical and religious texts, mainly in Greek. He edited Heraclitus' fragments twice during his time in Cambridge, in 1967 (editio maior) and 1968 (editio minor); the former, he also translated in Italian in 1968 and has been reprinted without alterations in 2017. A prolific author, he published two collections of papers on ancient philosophy and religion—in 1965 and 1988.

He had an uncommon breath of interests. At the beginning of his career, he edited the Davidiad by Marko Marulić (1957) and the Latin poems by Dalmatian poet and humanist Franjo Božičević (1958), both in first edition, and translated (in Spanish) and commented the Bhagavad-Gītā, one of the holy scriptures of Hinduism (1958). In 1968, he published a critical edition of Hippolytus' "Refutation of All Heresies", in which he revised the text published at the beginning of the century by Paul Wendland and for the first time welcomed unpublished conjectures by Hermann Fränkel, that certain passages in the codex unicus of Hippolytus' text are displaced.

In 1984 he published a monograph on Greek tragic trimeter, and some years later two collection of studies on Greek poetry (1991 – a second one in 2002) and on textual criticism of Patristic texts (1994).

Starting from his time in Cambridge, he became increasingly interested in Greek philosophy and Christianity, contributing to the Pauly-Wissowa with a monographic article on Heraclitus (1965) and editing, as mentioned before, Hippolytus' treatise "Refutation of All Heresies" (1968). He remained prolific in his late years after retirement, producing a series of critical editions, mainly of Christian authors: Prosper of Aquitaine ("De providentia Dei", 1989), Athenagoras of Athens ("Legatio pro Christianis", 1990; "De resurrectione mortuorum" [sp.], 2000), Justin the Martyr ("Cohortatio ad Graecos", "De monarchia" and "Oratio ad Graecos" [all sp.], 1990; "Apologiae pro Christianis", 1994; "Dialogus cum Tryphone", 1997), Tatian ("Oratio ad Graecos", 1995), Theophilus of Antioch ("Ad Autolycum", 1995), Origen ("Contra Celsum", 2001) and Clement of Alexandria (“Protrepticus”, 1995; "Paedagogus", 2002 [published posthumously]). At the same time, he edited and commented the Alcestis Barcinoensis (1988) and produced three Teubner editions: Theodore Prodromos' "De Rhodante et Dosiclis amoribus" (1992), Diogenes Laërtius' "Lives and Opinions of Eminent Philosophers" (2-volumes set, 1999, which included unpublished Byzantine paraphrases; Hans Gärtner edited a volume of indexes in 2002) and Eustathios Makrembolites' "De Hysmines et Hysminiae amoribus libri XI" (2001 [published posthumously]).

During his lifetime, Marcovich wrote and edited more than 30 books (not including the various issues of Illinois Classical Studies) and wrote 253 articles and essays in Spanish, German, Latin, Italian, French and Serbo-Croatian. At the beginning of his career, Marcovich also worked as a translator from German and Russian to Serbo-Croatian and published some textbooks (including Engels' The Evolution of Socialism).

=== Honours ===
Marcovich received an honorary doctorate degree in humanities from the University of Illinois in 1994; two Festschriften were published as monographic issues of the journal he founded, Illinois Classical Studies:

- Sansone, David, ed. (1993). Studies in Honor of Miroslav Marcovich. Illinois Classical Studies, 18. Vol. 1. Atlanta: Scholars Press. ISSN 0363-1923. JSTOR i23058495.
- Sansone, David, ed. (1994). Studies in Honor of Miroslav Marcovich. Illinois Classical Studies, 19. Vol. 2. Atlanta: Scholars Press. ISSN 0363-1923. JSTOR i23059375.

Other honors include the Silver Cross of Mount Athos (1963), a Guggenheim Fellowship (1983), a National Endowment of the Humanities Fellowship (1990) and an Albert Einstein Visiting Fellowship by the Israel Academy of Sciences (1993).

When he died, scholars Howard Jacobson and David Sansone published obituaries in his honor, and so did Fernando Báez, adding one in the reprint of Marcovich's edition of the Bhagavad-Gītā. Marcovich wrote his own epitaph in English, which scholars translated in several languages including Ancient Greek and Latin (J. K. Newman), Hebrew (Howard Jacobson), Sahidic Coptic and Sanskrit (Gerald M. Browne) and Syriac (Sebastian Brock).

== Personal ==
Marcovich died on 14 June 2001 at the Carle Foundation Hospital, Urbana, Illinois.

== Selected works ==
Entries followed by [†] are posthumous. Marcovich's full bibliography, except for critical editions nos. 24 ad 25, are found in:

- "Miroslav Marcovich: List of Publications". ICS. 18: 1–17. 1993. JSTOR 23064429.
- "Miroslav Marcovich: Addenda to List of Publications ("ICS" 18 [1993] 1–17)". ICS. 19: 1. 1994. JSTOR 23065414.
- "Miroslav Marcovi[c]h: List of Publications. Addenda et Corrigenda "ICS" 18 (1993) 1–17; 19 (1994) 1". ICS. 23–24: xi–xii. 2002–2003. JSTOR 23065444.

=== Critical editions ===
Entry no. 6 is an Italian translation of no. 5.

1. Marcovich, M., ed. (1957). M. Maruli Davidiadis ll. XIV. Emeritae: Typis Universitatis.
2. Marcovich, M., ed. (1958). Francisci Natalis carmina. Seorsum editorum liber 302. Belgradi: Academia Scientiarum.
3. Marcovich, M., ed. (1958). Bhagavad-Gītā (El Canto del Señor). Versión del sánscrito con una interpretación racional. Mérida: Los Andes U.P.
4. Marcovich, M., ed. (1967). Heraclitus. Editio maior. Mérida: Los Andes U.P.
5. Marcovich, M., ed. (1968). Heraclitus. Editio minor. Mérida: Los Andes U. P.
6. Eraclito (1968). Marcovich, M. (ed.). Frammenti. Biblioteca di studi superiori 64. Firenze: La Nuova Italia.
7. Hippolytus (1968). Marcovich, M. (ed.). Refutatio omnium haeresium. Patristische Texte und Studien 25. Berlin: Walter de Gruyter.
8. Marcovich, M., ed. (1988). Alcestis Barcinoensis. Text and Commentary. «Mnemosyne» Suppl. 103. Leiden: E.J. Brill.
9. Prosper of Aquitaine (1989). Marcovich, M. (ed.). De providentia Dei. Text and Commentary. «Vigiliae Christianae» Suppl. 10. Leiden: E.J. Brill.
10. Athenagoras (1990). Marcovich, M. (ed.). Legatio pro Christianis. Patristische Texte und Studien 31. Berlin: Walter de Gruyter.
11. Pseudo-Iustinus (1990). Marcovich, M. (ed.). Cohortatio ad Graecos; De monarchia; Oratio ad Graecos. Patristische Texte und Studien 32. Berlin: Walter de Gruyter.
12. Theodorus Prodromus (1992). Marcovich, M. (ed.). De Rhodantes et Dosiclis amoribus ll. IX. Bibliotheca Teubneriana. Stutgardiae et Lipsiae: Teubner.
13. Iustinus Martyr (1994). Marcovich, M. (ed.). Apologiae pro Christianis. Patristische Texte und Studien 38. Berlin: Walter de Gruyter.
14. Tatianus (1995). Marcovich, M. (ed.). Oratio ad Graecos. Patristische Texte und Studien 43. Berlin: Walter de Gruyter.
15. Theophilus Antiochenus (1995). Marcovich, M. (ed.). Ad Autolycum. Patristische Texte und Studien 44. Berlin: Walter de Gruyter.
16. Clemens Alexandrinus (1995). Marcovich, M. (ed.). Protrepticus. «Vigiliae Christianae» Suppl. 34. Leiden: E.J. Brill.
17. Iustinus Martyr (1997). Marcovich, M. (ed.). Dialogus cum Tryphone. Patristische Texte und Studien 47. Berlin: Walter de Gruyter.
18. Diogenes Laërtius (1999). Marcovich, M. (ed.). Vitae philosophorum. Bibliotheca Teubneriana. Vol. I–II: Vitae philosophorum & Excerpta Byzantina. Stutgardiae et Lipsiae: Teubner.
19. Athenagoras qui fertur (2000). Marcovich, M. (ed.). De resurrectione mortuorum. «Vigiliae Christianae» Suppl. 53. Leiden: E.J. Brill.
20. Eustathius Macrembolita (2001). Marcovich, M. (ed.). De Hysmines et Hysminiae amoribus libri XI. Bibliotheca Teubneriana. Munich–Leipzig: Saur.
21. Marcovich, M., ed. (2001). Heraclitus. International Pre-Platonic Studies 2. Reprint with Addenda. Sankt Augustin: Academia.
22. Clemens Alexandrinus (2002). Marcovich, M.; Van Winden, J. C. M. (eds.). Paedagogus. «Vigiliae Christianae» Suppl. 61. Leiden: E.J. Brill. [†]
23. Origenes (2002). Marcovich, M. (ed.). Contra Celsum libri VIII. «Vigiliae Christianae» Suppl. 54. Leiden: E. J. Brill. [†]
24. Diogenes Laërtius (2002). Marcovich, M.; Gärtner, H. (eds.). Vitae philosophorum. Bibliotheca Teubneriana. Vol. III: Indices. Monachii et Lipsiae: Saur. [†]
25. Marcovich, M., ed. (2003). Bhagavad-Gītā. El Canto del Señor. Mérida: Los Andes U.P. [†]
26. Marcovich, M., ed. (2006). M. Maruli Delmatae Davidias. Mittellateinischen Texte und Studien 33. Leiden: E.J. Brill. [†]
27. Eraclito (2017). Marcovich, M.; Mondolfo, R.; Taràn, L. (eds.). Testimonianze e frammenti. Il Pensiero Occidentale. Milano: Bompiani. [†]

=== Monographs ===
1. Marcovich, M. (1965). Estudios de Filosofía Griega. Mérida: Los Andes U. P.
2. Marcovich, M. (1968). Herakleitos: Sonderausgabe der Paulyschen RE. Stuttgart: Druckenmüller.
3. Marcovich, M. (1983). Filozofija Heraklita Mračnog [The Philosophy of Heraclitus the Obscure]. Belgrade: Nolit.
4. Marcovich, M. (1984). Three-Words Trimeter in Greek Tragedy. Beiträge zur klassische Philologie 158. Königstein/Taunus: Anton Hain.
5. Marcovich, M. (1988). Studies in Graeco-Roman Religions and Gnosticism. Studies in Greek and Roman Religions 4. Leiden: E.J. Brill.
6. Marcovich, M. (1991). Studies in Greek Poetry. «Illinois Classical Studies» Suppl. 1. Atlanta: Scholars Press.
7. Marcovich, M. (1994). Patristic Textual Criticism. «Illinois Classical Studies» Suppl. 6. Vol. 1. Atlanta: Scholars Press.
8. Marcovich, M. (2002). Studies in Ancient Religions. Niksic: University of Montenegro Press. [†]

=== Translations and textbooks ===
1. Engels, Fr. (1946). Razvitak socijalizma od utopije do nauke [The Evolution of Socialism from Utopia to Science]. Translated by Marcovich, M. Belgrade: Kultura.
2. Plekhanov, G. (1946). K pitanju o ulozi ličnosti u istorij [The Development of the Monist View of History]. Translated by Marcovich, M. Belgrade: Kultura.
3. Bjelinski, Vissarion (1947). O kritici [The Critic]. Translated by Marcovich, M. Belgrade: Kultura.
4. Dobrolyubov, N. (1947). Književno-kritički članci [Literary-Critical Papers]. Translated by Marcovich, M. Belgrade: Kultura. pp. 5–127.
5. Aleksandrov, G. P. (1948). Istorija zapadnoevropske filosofije [History of Western European Philosophy]. Translated by Marcovich, M. Belgrade: Kultura.
6. Aleksandrov, G. P. (1949–1950). Istorija filosofije [History of Philosophy]. Vol. I–II. Translated by Marcovich, M. Belgrade: Kultura.
7. Akademije Nauka SSSR (1950). Istorija engleske knjizevnosti [History of English Literature]. Vol. I.2. Translated by Marcovich, M. Belgrade: Naučna knjiga. pp. 121–558.
8. Mashkin, N. (1951). Istorjia starog Rima [History of Ancient Rome]. Translated by Marcovich, M.; Papazoglu, F. Belgrade: Naučna knjiga.
9. Marcovich, M., ed. (1951). Florilegium Philosophy Graecum [Anthology of Greek Philosophy]. Belgrade: Naučna knjiga.
10. Tronsky, J. (1952). Istorjia grcke knjizevnosti [History of Greek Literature]. Translated by Marcovich, M. Belgrade: Naučna knjiga.
11. Avdijev, Vs. I. (1952). Istorija starog Istoka [History of the Ancient East]. Translated by Marcovich, M. Belgrade: Naučna knjiga.
12. Udaljcova, A. D.; Kosminskog, J. A.; Vajnštajna, O. L. (1952). Istorija srednjeg veka [History of the Middle Ages]. Vol. I–II. Translated by Marcovich, M. Belgrade: Naučna knjiga.
13. Aristotel (1954). Kategorije [Categories]. Translated by Marcovich, M. Belgrade: Kultura.
14. Heraklit (1954). Kategorije [Fragments]. Translated by Marcovich, M. Belgrade: Kultura.
15. Horacije (1956). Odabrane Pesme [Selected Odes]. Translated by Marcovich, M. Belgrade: Nolit.
16. Marcovich, M. (1956). Latín en seis Lecciones [Latin in Six Lessons]. Barcelona: s.n.
17. Marcovich, M. (1958). Griego en seis Lecciones [Greek in Six Lessons]. Mérida: Los Andes U.P.
18. Marcovich, M., ed. (1959). Pequeña Antología Estética de la Literatura Latina [Little Aesthetic Anthology of Latin Literature]. Mérida: Los Andes U.P.
19. Marcovich, M. (1981). "Bhagavad-Gītā". In Iveković, R. (ed.). Počeci Indijske Misli [The Origins of Indian Thought]. Belgrade: BIGZ. pp. 223–331, 439–451.
20. Bhagavad-Gītā. Translated by Marcovich, M. Belgrade: BIGZ. 1989.
21. Bhagavad-Gītā. Translated by Marcovich, M. Kruševac: Bagdala. 1993.

=== Selected articles ===
All entries are arranged chronologically and, for each year, alphabetically.

- Marcovich, M. (1954). "O izvorima Quaestiones physicae Teofilakta Simokate" [On the Sources of Simocatta's Quaestiones Physicae] (PDF). Živa Antika (in Serbian). 4 (1): 120–135.
- Marcovich, M. (1978). "A New Riddle". Zeitschrift für Papyrologie und Epigraphik. 29: 50.
- Marcovich, M. (1978). "Euripides, I. T. 110–115". Mnemosyne. Series 3. 30 (3): 288–289. doi:10.1163/156852577X00545.
- Marcovich, M. (1978). "P.Oxy. 3239: Alphabetic Glossary". Zeitschrift für Papyrologie und Epigraphik. 29: 49.
- Marcovich, M. (1979). "Athenagoras, De Resurrectione 3. 2". Journal of Theological Studies. 29: 146–147.
- Marcovich, M. (1979). "On the text of Athenagoras, De Resurrectione". Vigiliae Christianae. 33 (4): 375–382. doi:10.1163/157007279X00318.
- Marcovich, M. (1979). "Theophilus of Antioch: Fifty-Five Emendations". Illinois Classical Studies. 4: 76–93.
- Marcovich, M. (1981). "Ps.-Justin, Cohortatio: A Lost Editio Princeps?". Illinois Classical Studies. 6: 172–174.
- Marcovich, M. (1981). "The Wedding Hymn of Acta Thomas". Illinois Classical Studies. 6: 367–385. <https://www.ideals.illinois.edu/items/17235>
- Marcovich, M. (1984). "Alcestis Barcinoensis". Illinois Classical Studies. 9 (1): 111–134. JSTOR 23062585.
- Marcovich, M. (1986). "P.Yale 1206". Zeitschrift für Papyrologie und Epigraphik. 65: 58.
- Marcovich, M. (1986). "The Alcestis Papyrus Revisited". Zeitschrift für Papyrologie und Epigraphik. 65: 39–57.
- Marcovich, M. (1987). "On Marcovich's Alcestis: A Reply". Zeitschrift für Papyrologie und Epigraphik. 68: 29–32.
- Marcovich, M. (1987). "The Alcestis Papyrus Revisited: Addendum". Zeitschrift für Papyrologie und Epigraphik. 69: 231–236.
- Marcovich, M. (1987). "The Itinerary of Constantine Manasses". Illinois Classical Studies. 12 (2): 277–291. JSTOR 23064042.

== See also ==
- Sator Square, a subject Marcovich wrote papers on.

== Sources ==
- Fernando Báez, "Una Semblanza de Miroslav Marcovich" in Miroslav Marcovich, Bhagavadgita: El Canto del Señor (Mérida: ULA 2003).
