= Aspasius of Tyre =

Ancient Greek rhetorician

Aspasius of Tyre (Ancient Greek: Ἀσπάσιος ὁ Τύριος) was a rhetorician and historian of Ancient Greece. According to the 10th-century Byzantine encyclopedia called the Suda, he wrote a history of Epirus and of things remarkable in that country (called On Tyre and its Citizens), in twenty books, as well as theoretical works on rhetoric (called On the Art of Rhetoric), and some others.

Some fragments of his work are contained within Karl Wilhelm Ludwig Müller's Fragmenta Historicorum Graecorum.

The classical scholar Malcolm Heath has suggested that this Aspasius was a pupil of the second century sophist Apsines of Gadara, and was the actual author of the work Art of Rhetoric that has traditionally been ascribed to Apsines (which would offer some explanation for the several third-person references to Apsines that are present in that book).

The time in which he lived is uncertain. Scholars believe it is likely he lived in the second century CE. He may be the same person as Aspasius of Byblos.
