= Apsines (sophist) =

Sophist from Athens

Apsines (Ancient Greek: Ἀψίνης) was a sophist from Athens. He was a son of Onasimus (Ancient Greek: Ὀνάσιμος), and grandson of another Apsines who was an Athenian sophist. It is not impossible that he may be the Apsines whose commentary on Demosthenes is mentioned by Ulpian, and who taught rhetoric at Athens at the time of Aedesius, in the fourth century CE, though this Apsines is called a Lacedaemonian.

This Apsines and his disciples were hostile to Julianus, a contemporary rhetorician at Athens, and to his school. This enmity grew so much that Athens in the end found itself in a state of civil warfare, which required the presence of a Roman proconsul to suppress.
