= British Centre for Literary Translation =

Organisation supporting the study of Literary Translation

The British Centre for Literary Translation (BCLT) is a research centre in the School of Literature, Drama and Creative Writing at the University of East Anglia (UEA) in Norwich, England. BCLT was founded in 1989 with a grant from the Arts Council by German writer and academic W. G. Sebald (18 May 1944 – 14 December 2001), who was Professor of European Literature at UEA.

BCLT offers a public programme supporting professional literary translators through its annual Literary Translation and Creative Writing Summer School, translator residencies, translation workshops, and a library devoted to international and translated literature housed at UEA.

BCLT co-sponsors the annual John Dryden Translation Competition, the Warwick Prize for Women in Translation and is a member of the RECIT network of European literary translation centres.

== Sebald Lecture ==
BCLT's annual public lecture series was originally established by Sebald as the St. Jerome Lecture. The inaugural lecture was given by George Steiner on 26 April 1994 at UEA's Sainsbury Centre for Visual Arts.

Renamed the Sebald Lecture in 2003 to honour BCLT's founder, the lecture continues to be given annually by a prominent cultural figure, on an aspect of literary translation. Previous speakers have included Margaret Atwood, Hans Magnus Enzensberger, Carlos Fuentes, Seamus Heaney, Arundhati Roy, and Susan Sontag. Most of the speakers have referenced Sebald's work during their lecture, and in one instance, Will Self's 2009-2010 lecture was completely devoted to Sebald.
