= Apsines =

Greek rhetorician

Apsines of Gadara (Ancient Greek: Ἀψίνης ὁ Γαδαρεύς; fl. 3rd century AD) was a Greek rhetorician. He was a native of the Hellenised city of Gadara, whose ruins stand today at the border of Jordan with Syria and Israel. Apsines went on to study at Smyrna and taught at Athens, gaining such a reputation that he was raised to the consulship by the emperor Maximinus. He was a rival of Fronto of Emesa, and a friend of Philostratus, the author of the Lives of the Sophists, who praises his wonderful memory and accuracy.

Two rhetorical treatises by him are extant:

1. His Τέχνη ῥητορική ("Art of Rhetoric") is a greatly interpolated handbook of rhetoric, a considerable portion being taken from the Rhetoric of Longinus and other material from Hermogenes of Tarsus (the scholar Malcolm Heath posits this work was actually written by Aspasius of Tyre);

an English translation was first published in 1997. Malcolm Heath has argued (APJ 1998) that the work's attribution to Apsines is incorrect.

1. A smaller work, Περὶ ἐσχηματισμένων προβλημάτων ("on Propositions maintained figuratively").

== Editions ==
- Jan Bake (1849)
- Spengel-Hammer, Rhetores Graeci (1894)
- Mervin R. Dilts and George A. Kennedy, eds., Two Greek Rhetorical Treatises from the Roman Empire (Brill, 1997)
