= St. Francis Xavier's Church, Sampaloor =

St. Francis Xavier's Pilgrim Church, Sampaloor
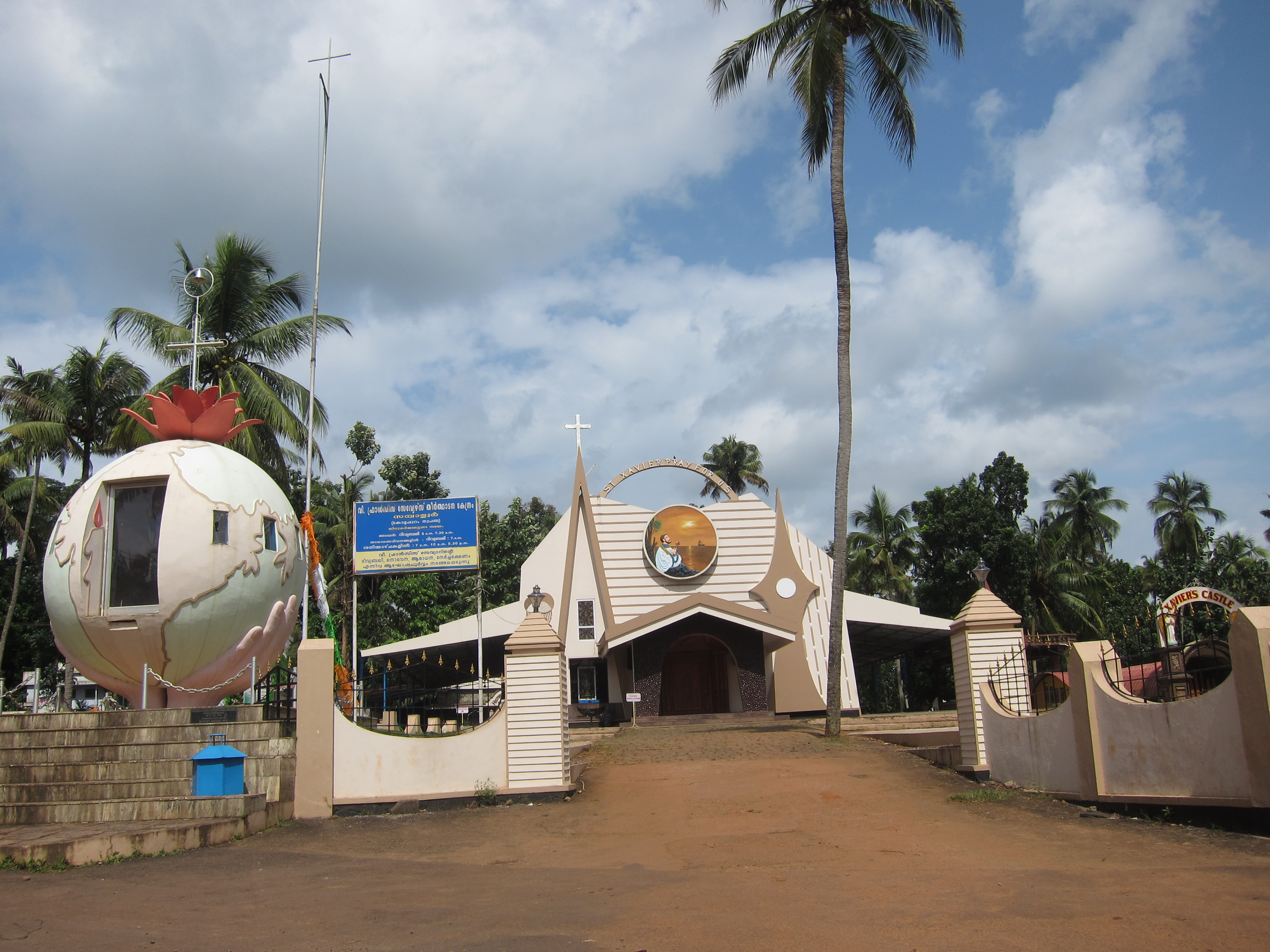
- St. Francis Xavier's Pilgrim Church, Sampaloor
- 10°16′7″N 76°17′48″E
- Location: Sampaloor, Kadukutty, Chalakudy taluk, Thrissur district, Kerala
- Country: India
- Denomination: Latin Catholic Church
- Churchmanship: High church
- Website: https://sampaloorchurch.org

History
- Status: Church
- Dedication: Francis Xavier
- Consecrated: 1862

Architecture
- Functional status: Active
- Architectural type: Modern

Administration
- Diocese: Roman Catholic Diocese of Kottapuram
- Parish: St. Francis Xavier's Church parish

Clergy
- Archbishop: Joseph Kalathiparambil
- Bishop: Bishop Ambrose Puthenveettil
- Priest: Rev. Fr. Dr. Johnson Panketh

St. Francis Xavier's Church, Sampaloor, popularly known as Sampaloor Palli, is a pilgrim centre coming under the Diocese of Kottapuram of the Archdiocese of Verapoly. It is situated along Palayamparambu Road, at Sampaloor, Mala in Thrissur district of the south Indian state of Kerala. The church is best known for hosting a number of Christian saints and missionaries including Francis Xavier, John de Britto, Arnos Pathiri and Constanzo Beschi.

== Overview ==
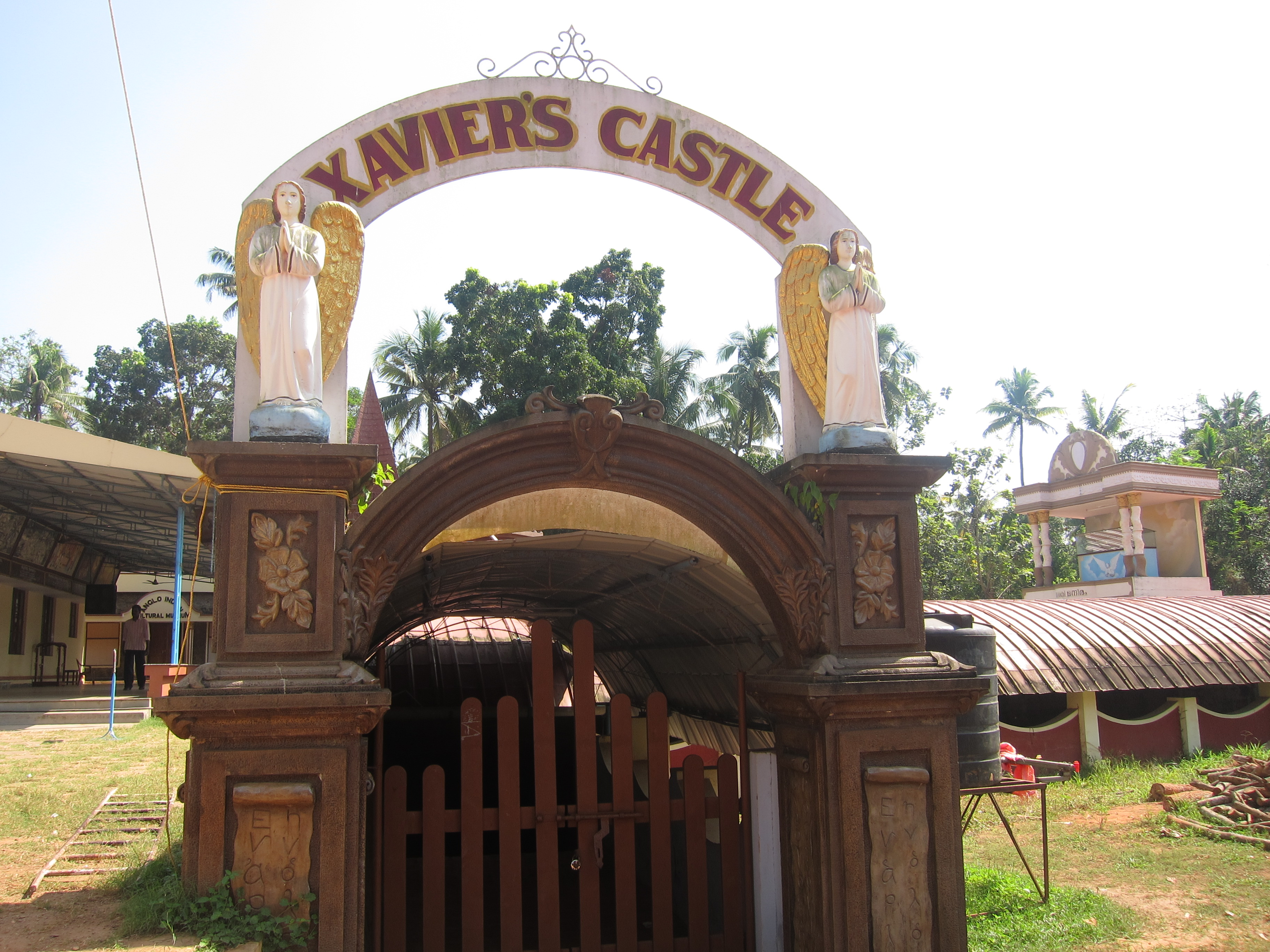
Xavier's Castle

Sampaloor, the place where the church is located, had a number of missionary visitors in its history, starting with Francis Xavier, who visited the village first in 1542, followed by two more visits in 1544 and 1548. The name of the village, prior to the arrival of Francis Xavier was Ambazhakad, and the concentration of Jesuit population in the village started in 1600s when they had to flee Kochi after the Dutch asserted their supremacy in Kochi. The Jesuits relocated the St. Paul's Seminary at Kochi to Ambalakad and called the place, são(n)-paulo(u)-ur, meaning the land of São Paulo (St. Paul), to honour the memory of Paul the Apostle. Another Catholic saint, John de Britto visited the place, estimated to be in 1673-74, followed by Constantine Joseph Beschi, alternatively known as Veera Mamunyar, an Italian missionary and the author of Thembavani, whose resting place is by the church.

It was to the St. Paul's Seminary in Sampaloor, the German Jesuit priest and missionary, Johann Ernst Hanxleden, better identified as Arnos Pathiri, came after his novitiate studies in Goa. While continuing his ecclesiastical studies, Pathiri studied Sanskrit and Malayalam while staying at Sampaloor and was ordained as a priest at this church. The church was destroyed during the invasion of Malabar by Tippu Sultan in 1781, and a new church was constructed in its place by Bernadian Bechinelly, the then vicar apostolate of Varapuzha in 1862 which was renovated twice, in 1893 and 1970 and the present church getting consecrated on 2 December 1979.

The church complex, besides St. Paul's seminary, is home to St. Paul's Press and St. Paul's Monastery and it was at this press which was established in 1663, many of the early publications of Jesuit priests in the area were printed, including the first text in Malayalam. The church premises also hold two museums, Historicum Museum and Anglo-Indian Cultural Museum and several exhibits such as cannon balls used by Tippu Sultan during the invasion, lamps, vestments, tablets and statues are displayed in these museums.

== Location ==
Sampaloor is a small village, sitting on the banks of Chalakudy River, in Kadukutty panchayat of Chalakudy taluk in the south Indian state of Kerala. The church is accessible by rail through Chalakudy railway station roughly 7 km away. The nearest airport is Cochin International Airport which is around 25 km away from the church.

== Gallery ==
=== Old church ===
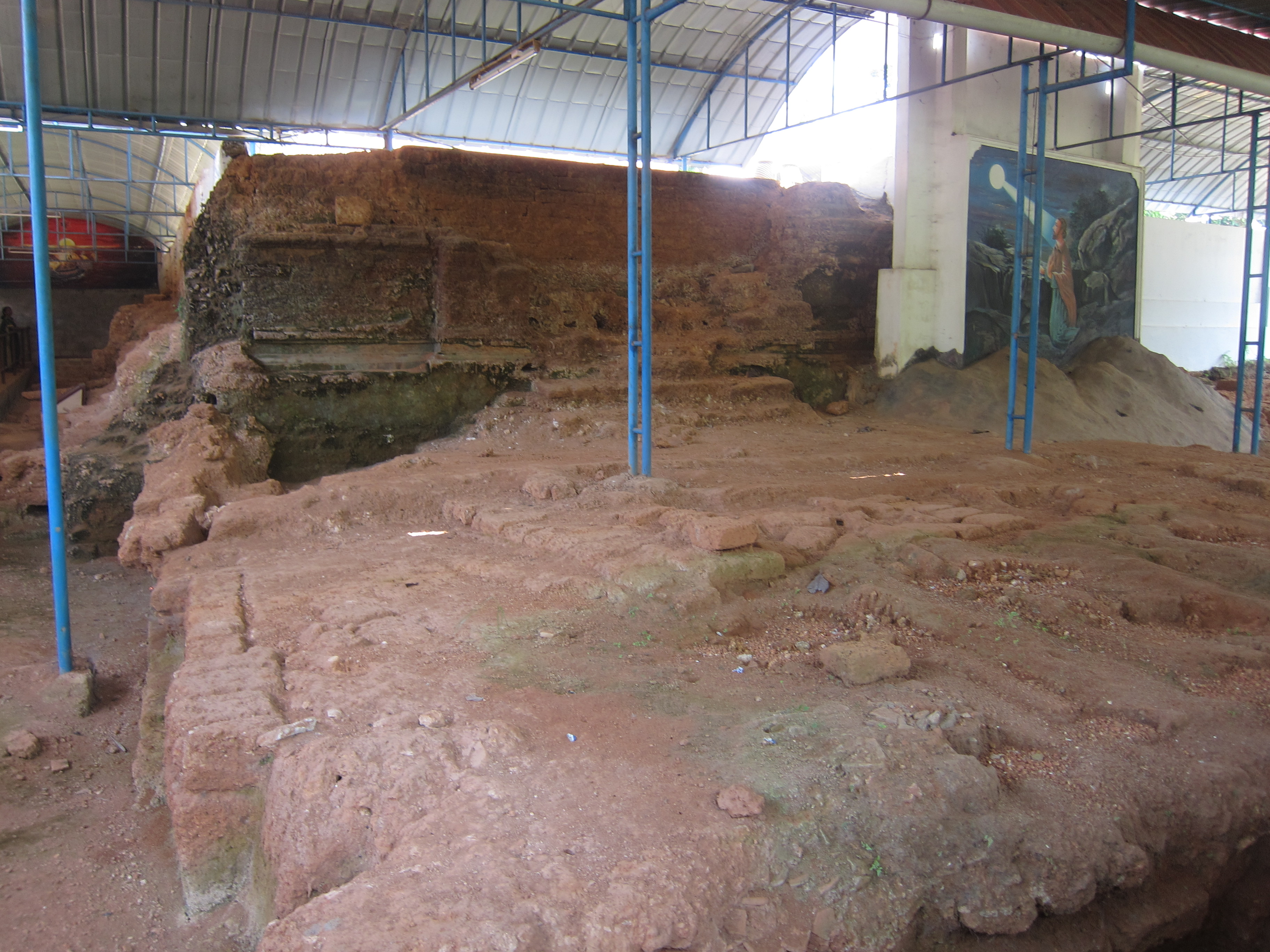
Remains of Old Sampaloor Church - 001

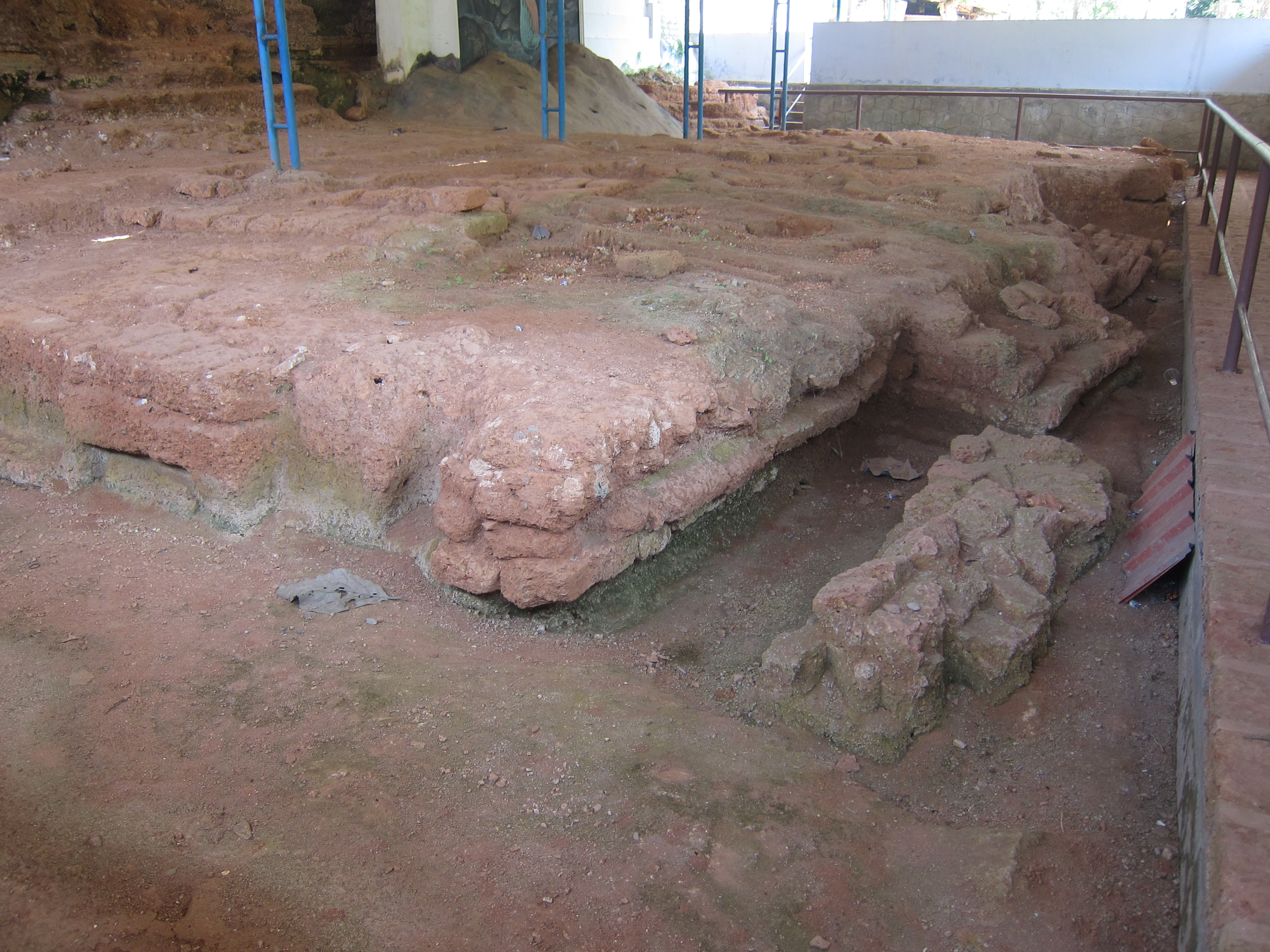
Remains of Old Sampaloor Church - 002

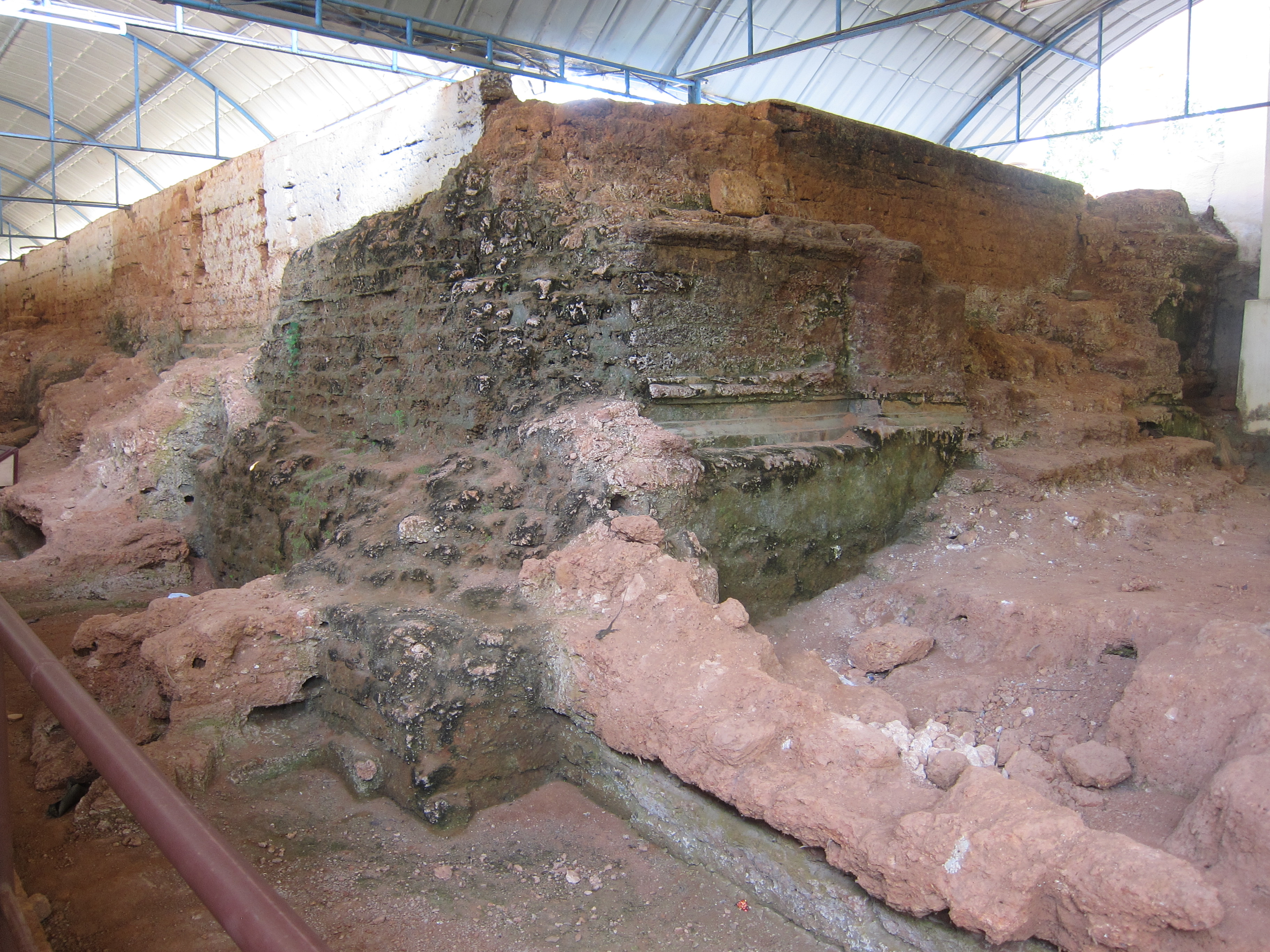
Remains of Old Sampaloor Church - 003

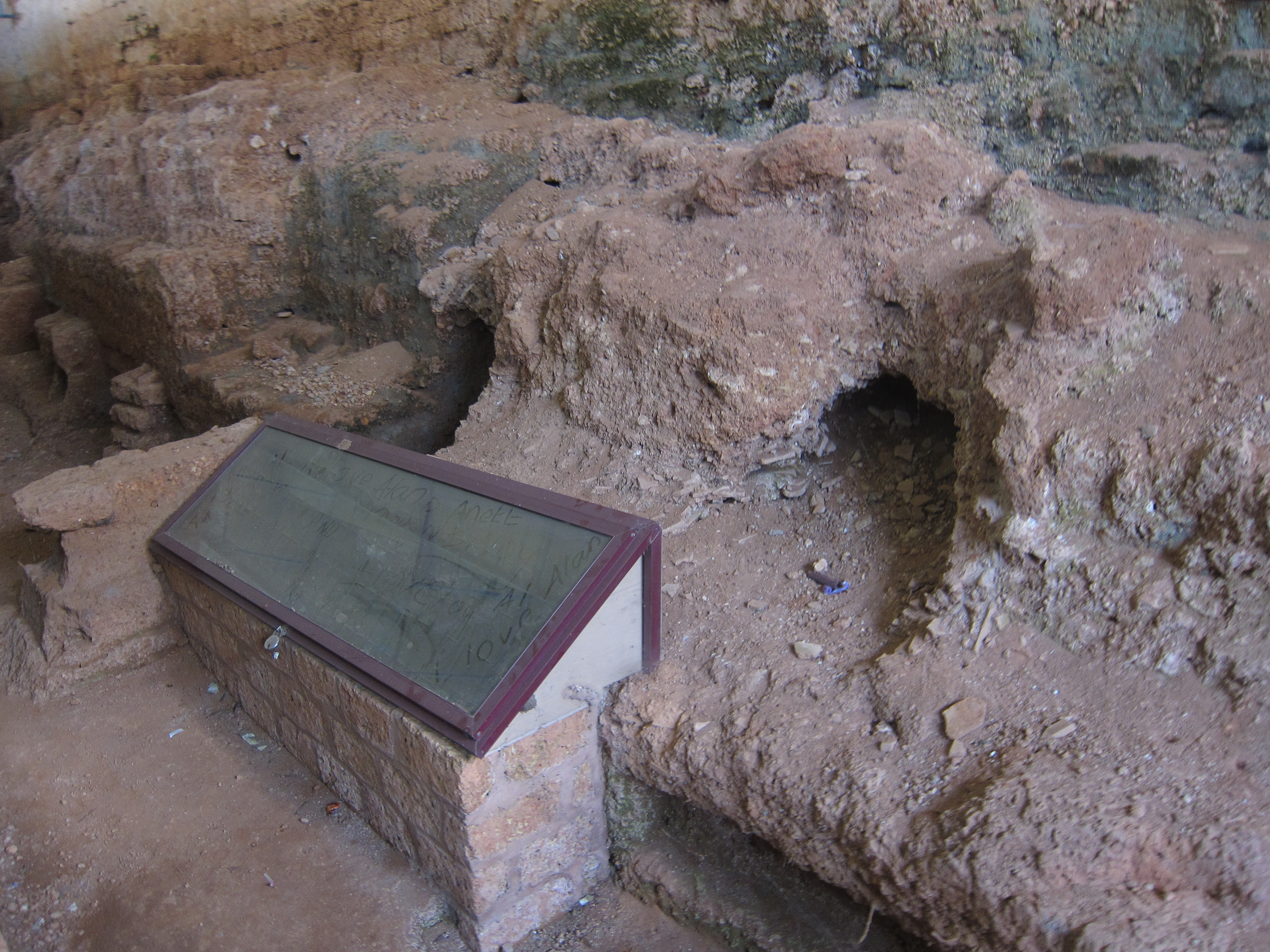
Remains of Old Sampaloor Church - 004

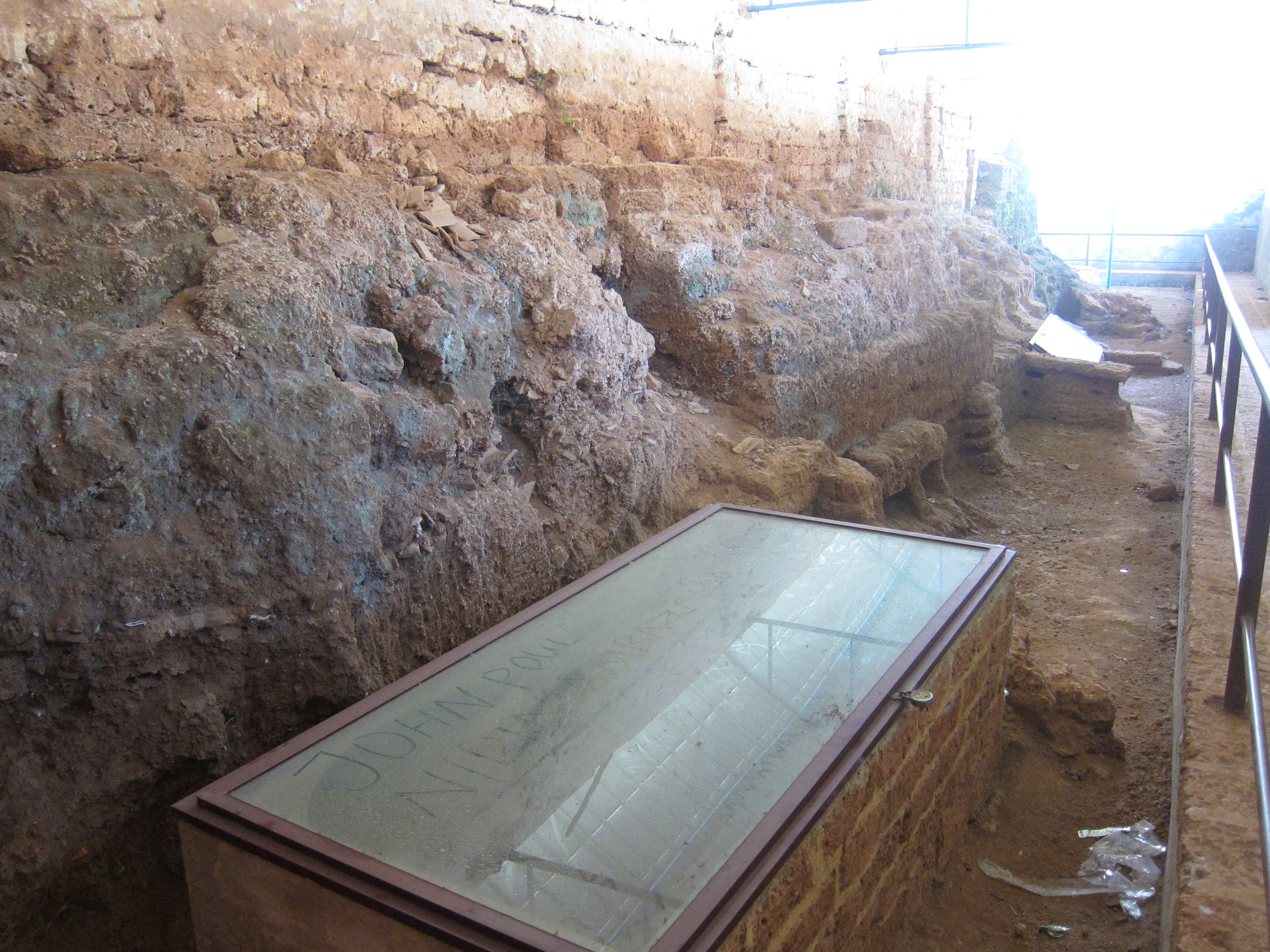
Remains of Old Sampaloor Church - 005

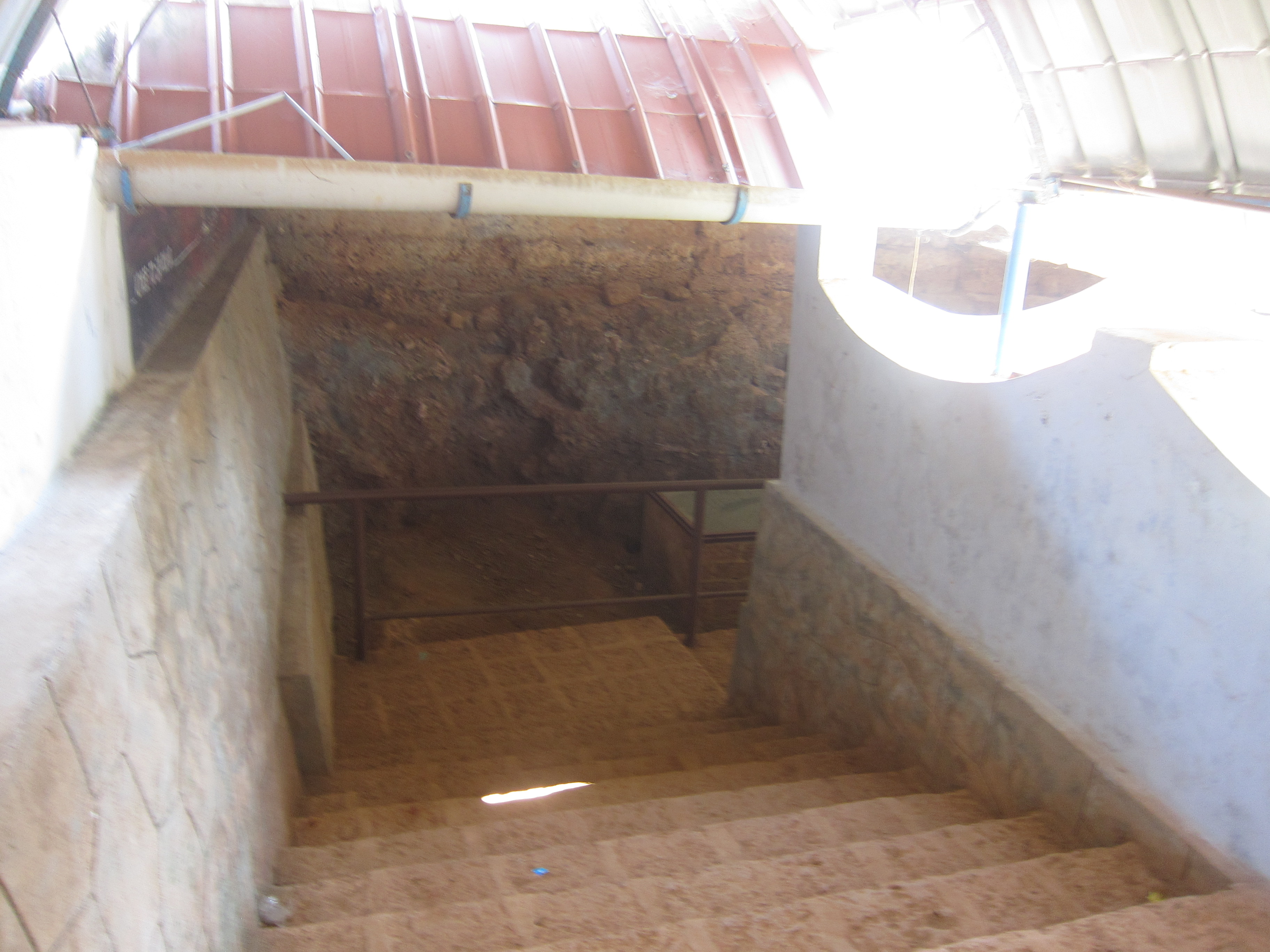
Remains of Old Sampaloor Church - 006

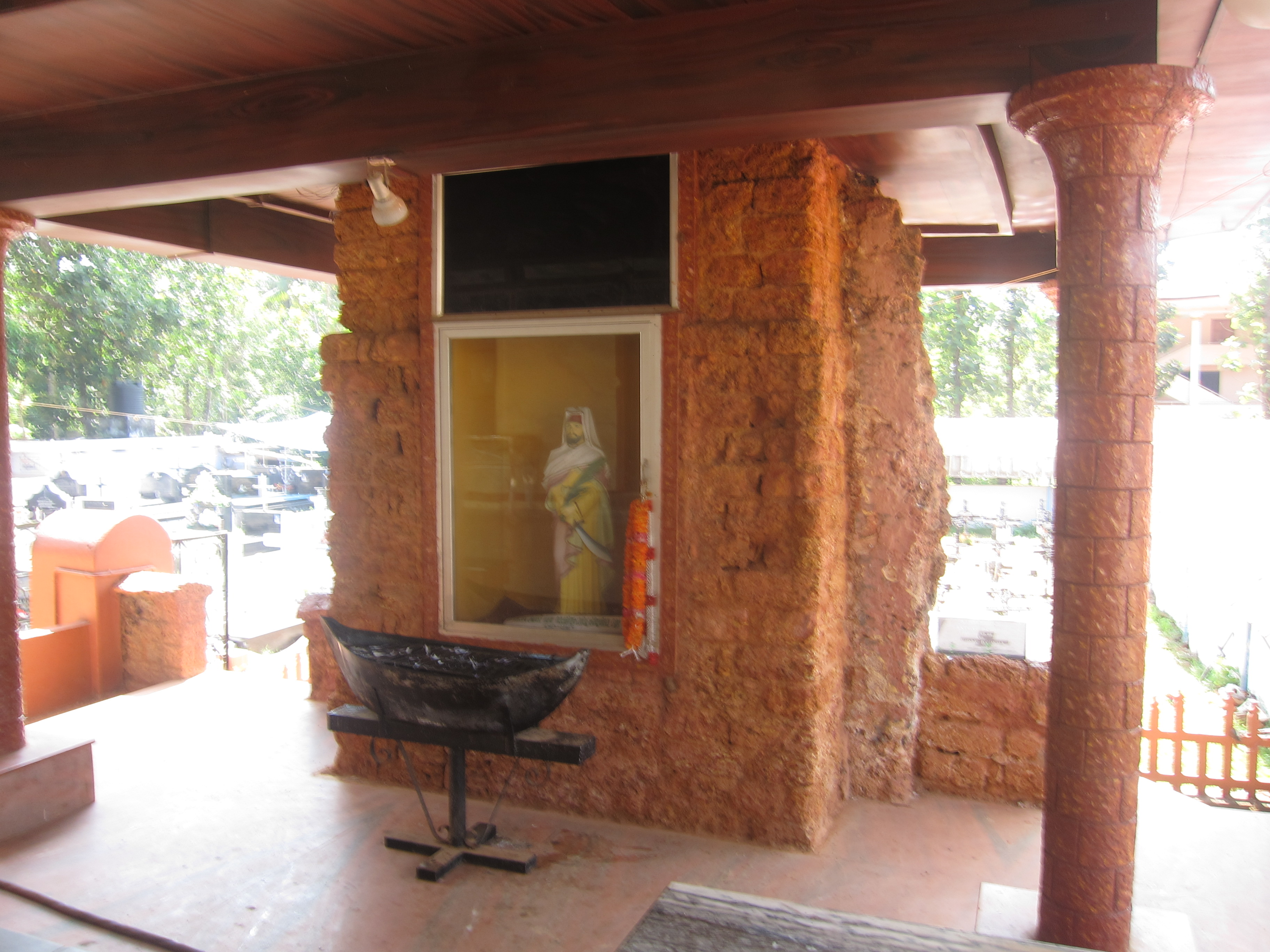
Remains of Old Sampaloor Church - 007

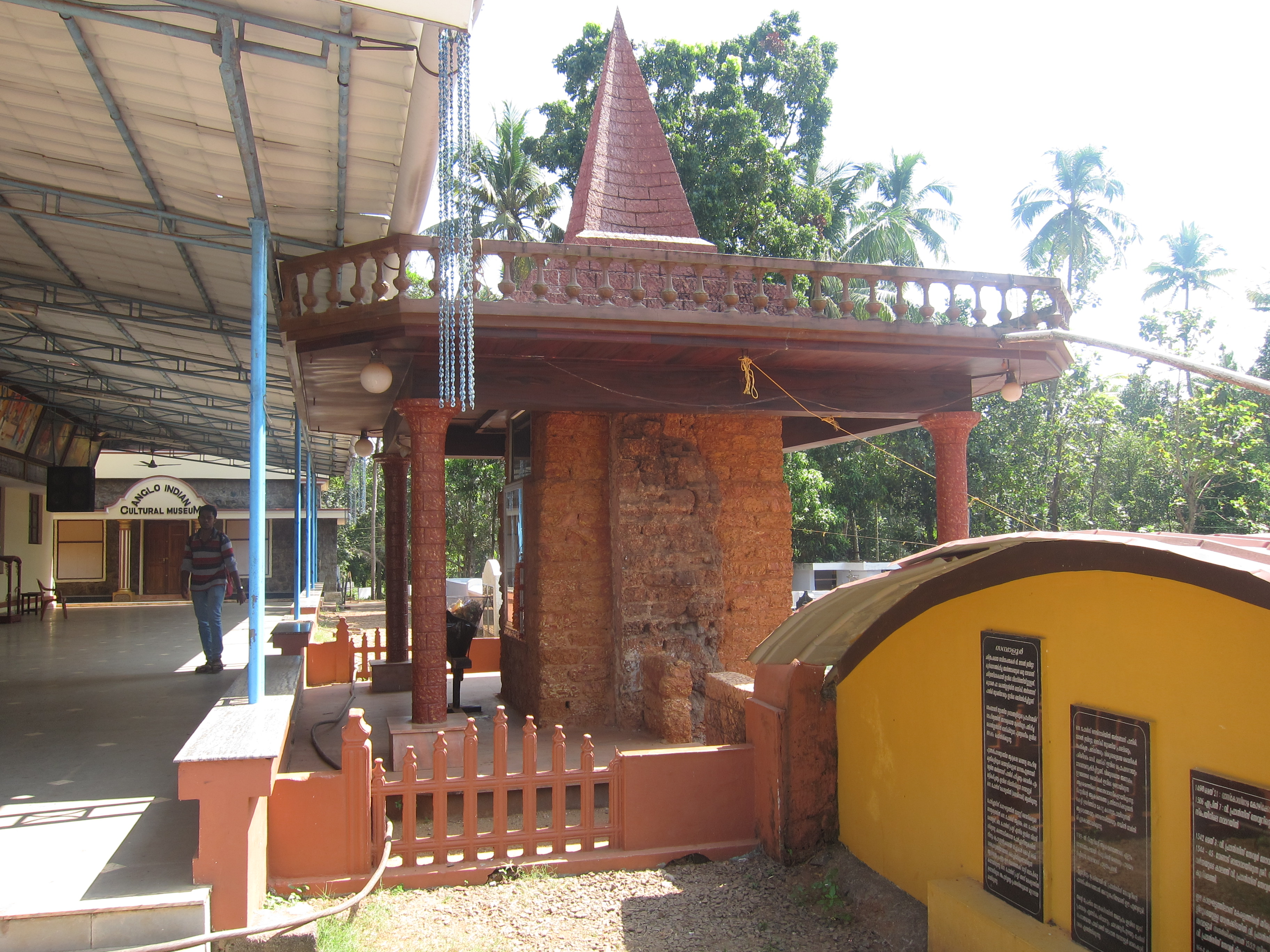
Remains of Old Sampaloor Church - 008

=== New church ===
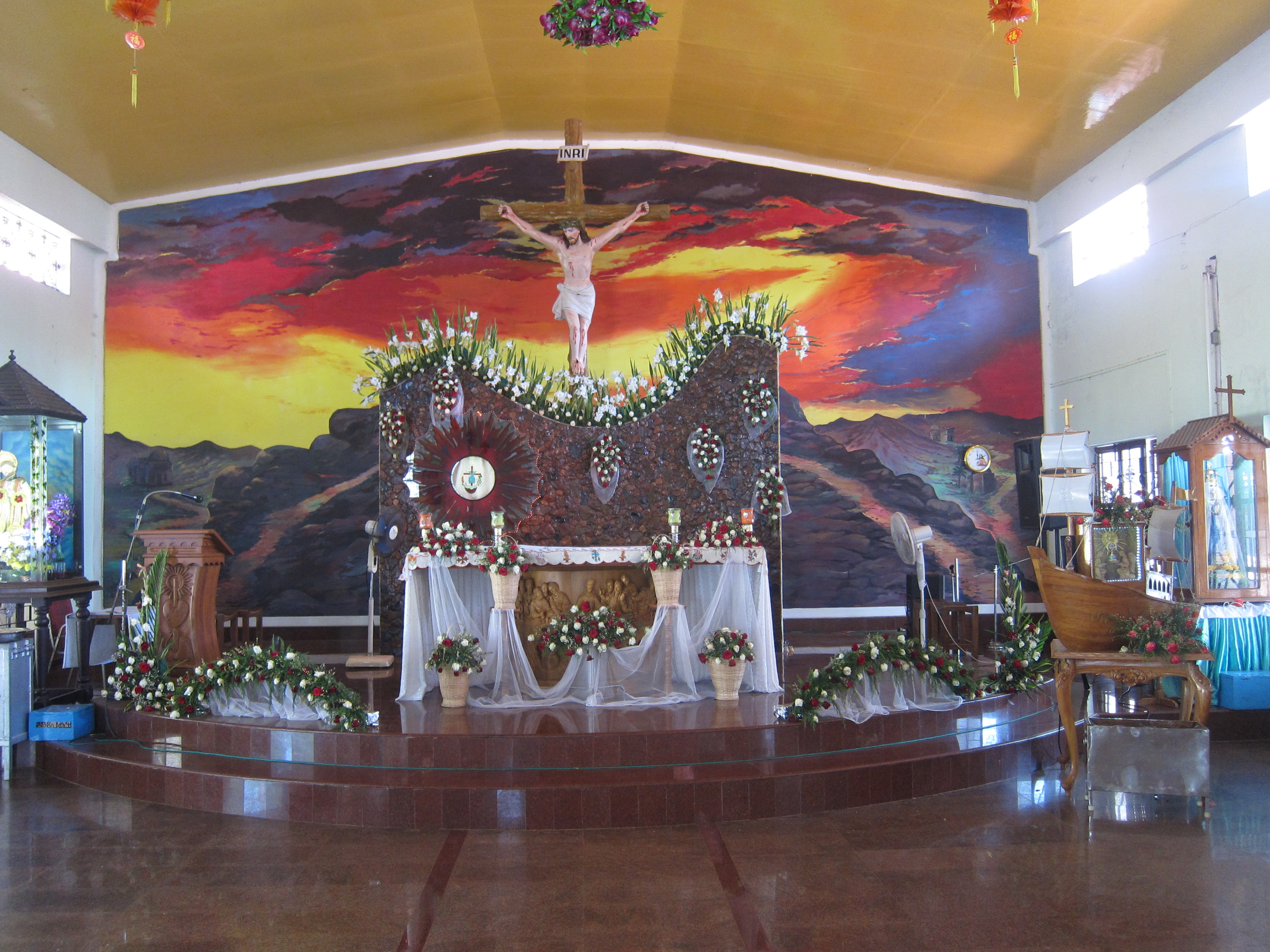
Altar

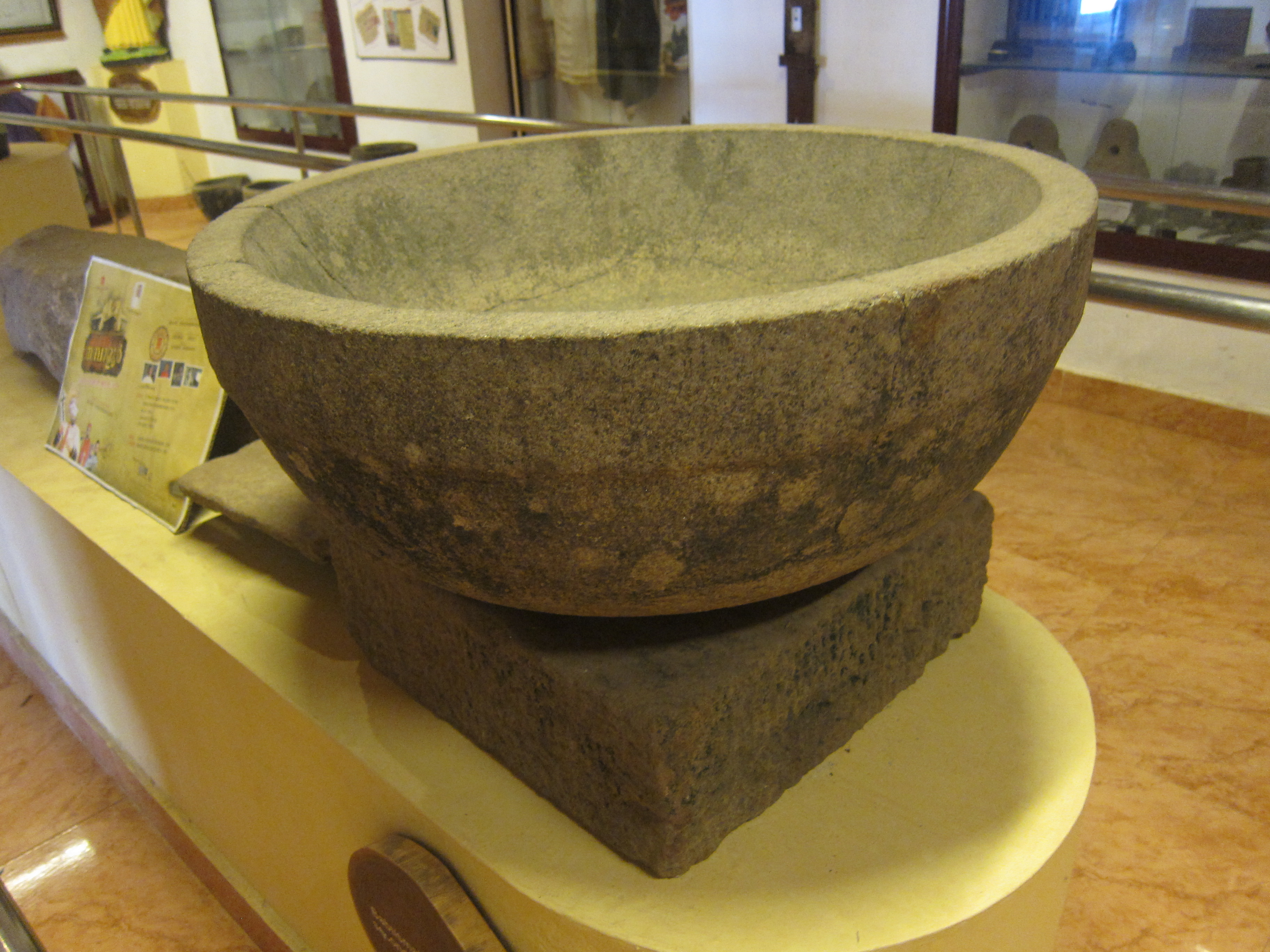
Baptismal font

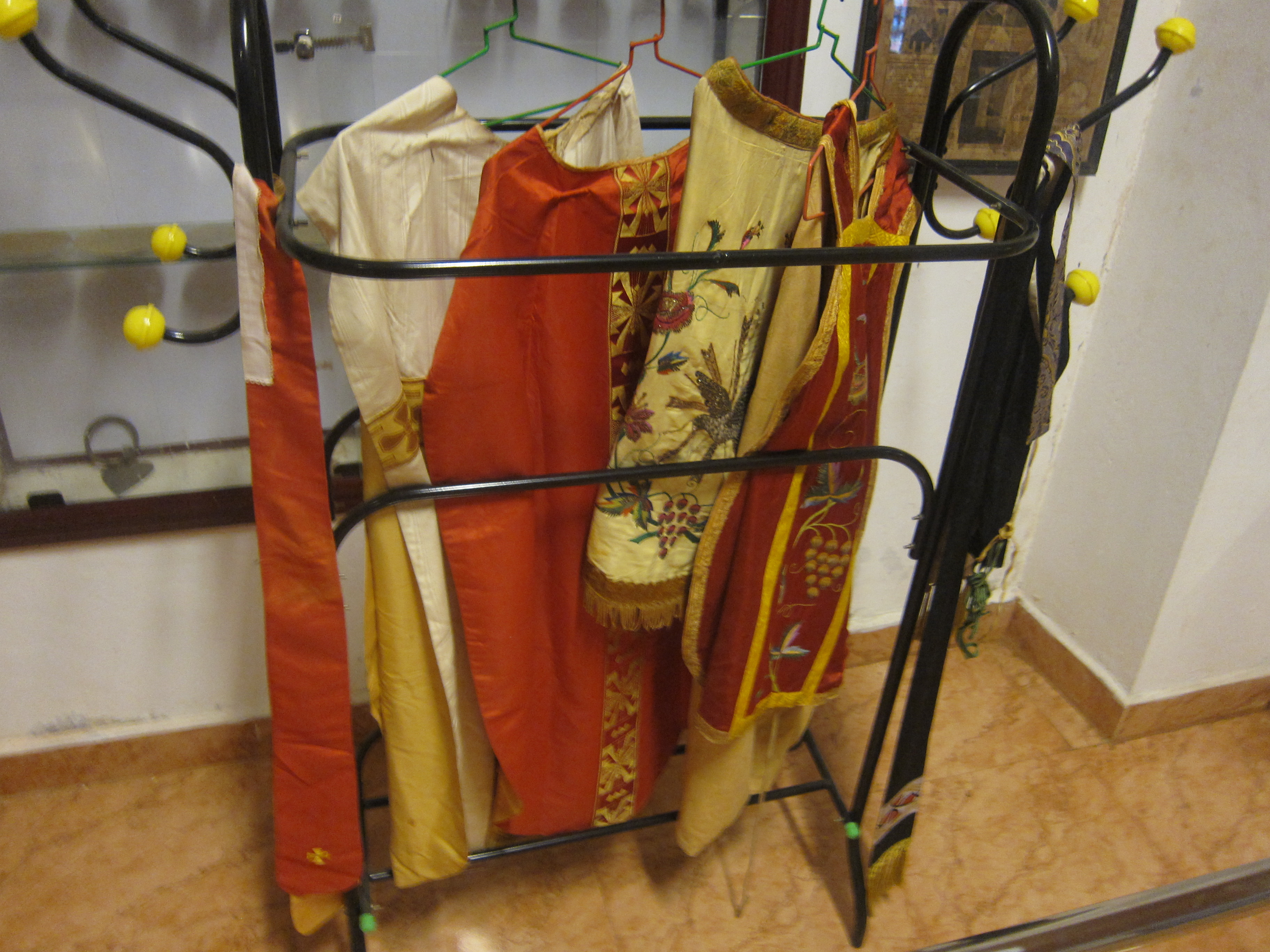
Clerical clothing

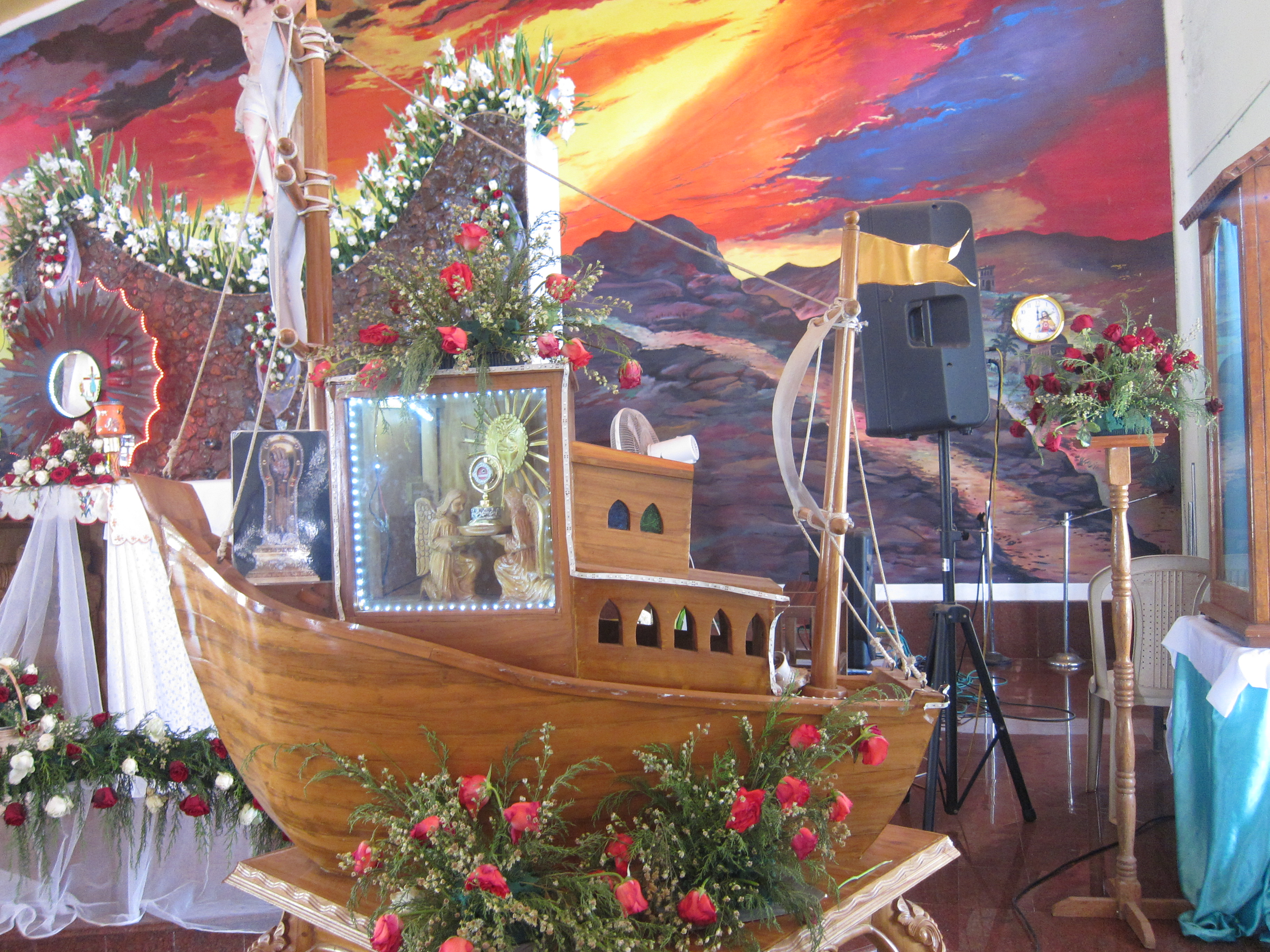
An exhibit of a ship

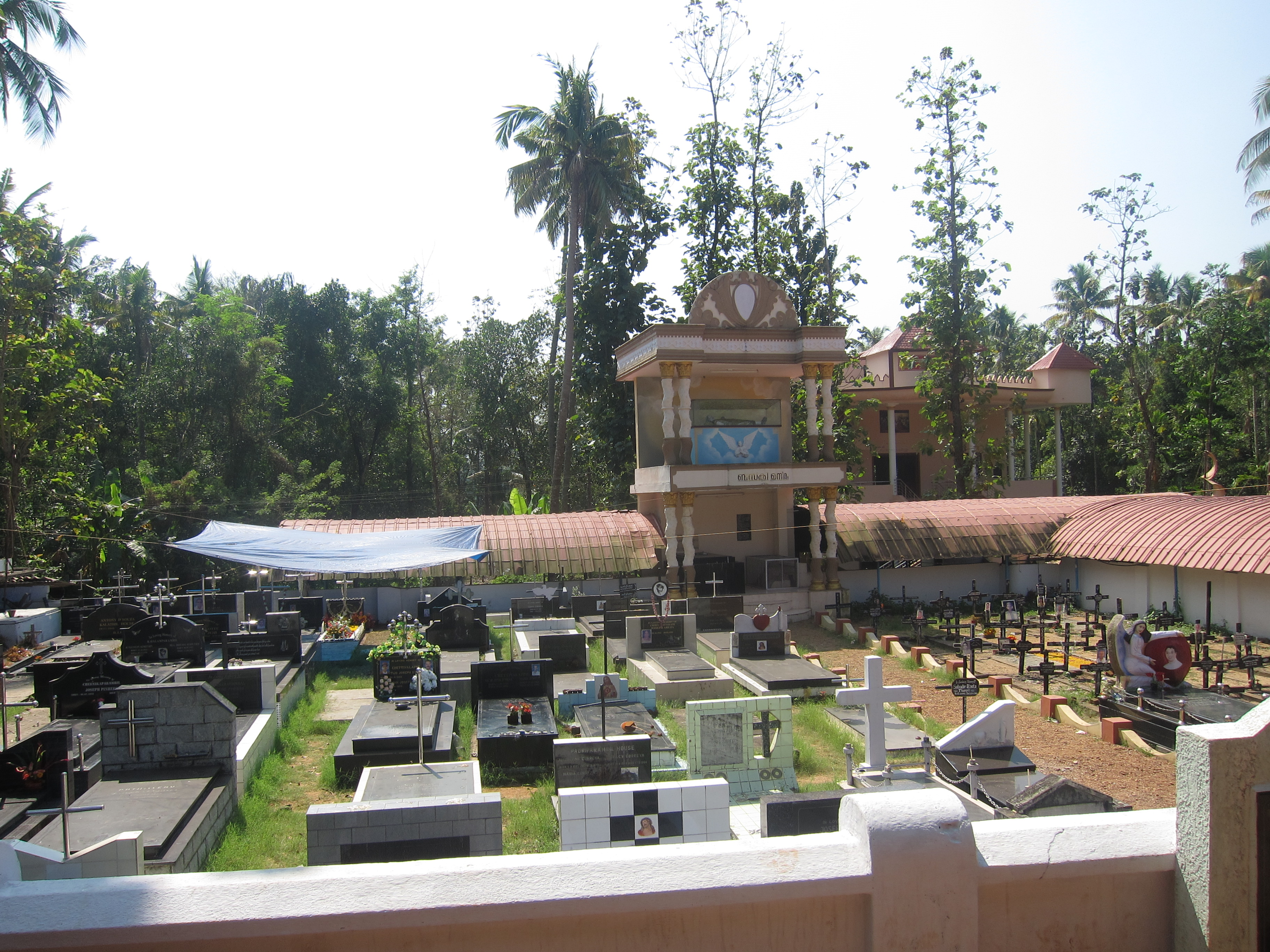
Church Cemetery

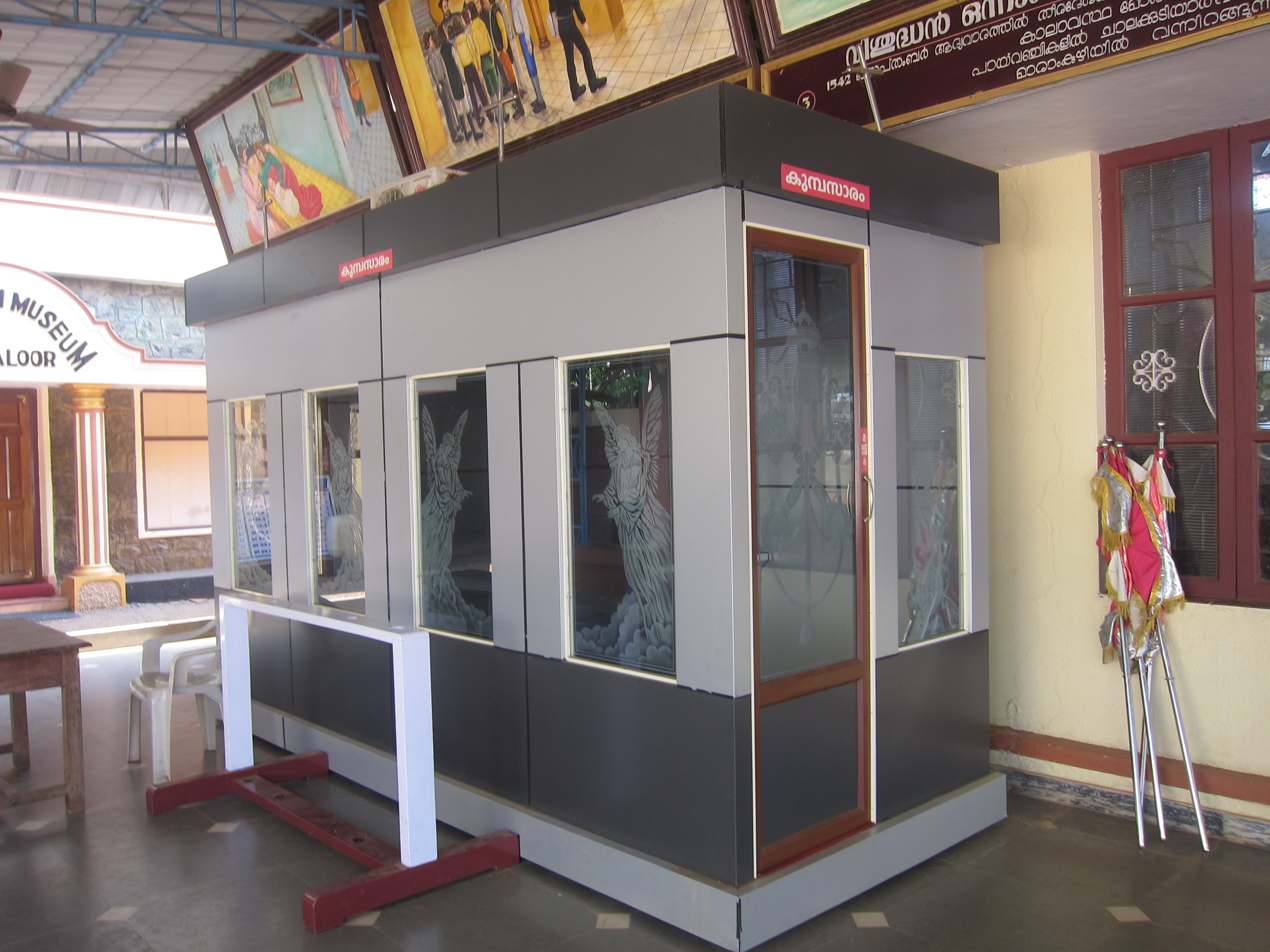
Confession Box

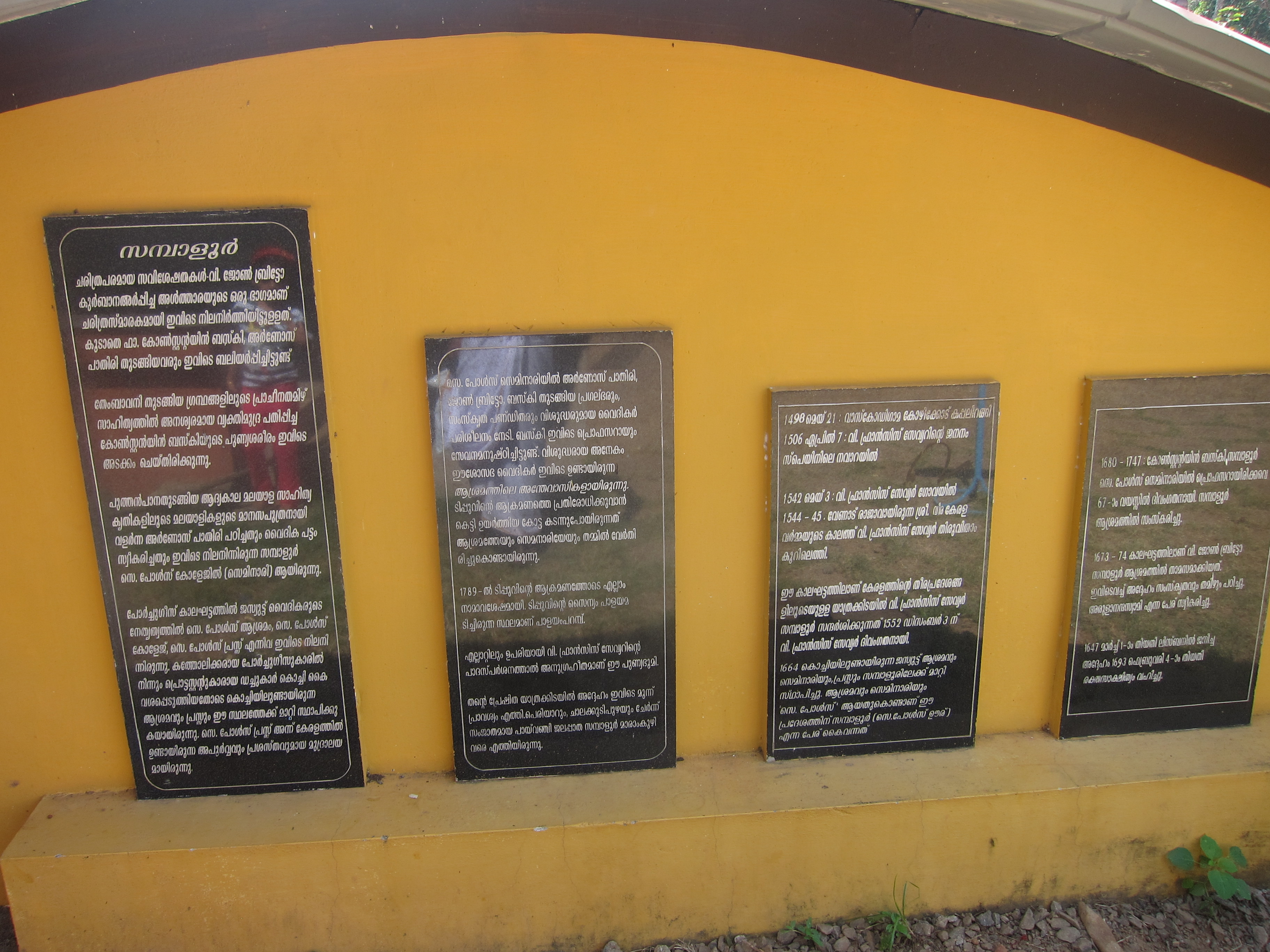
History displayed on the church wall

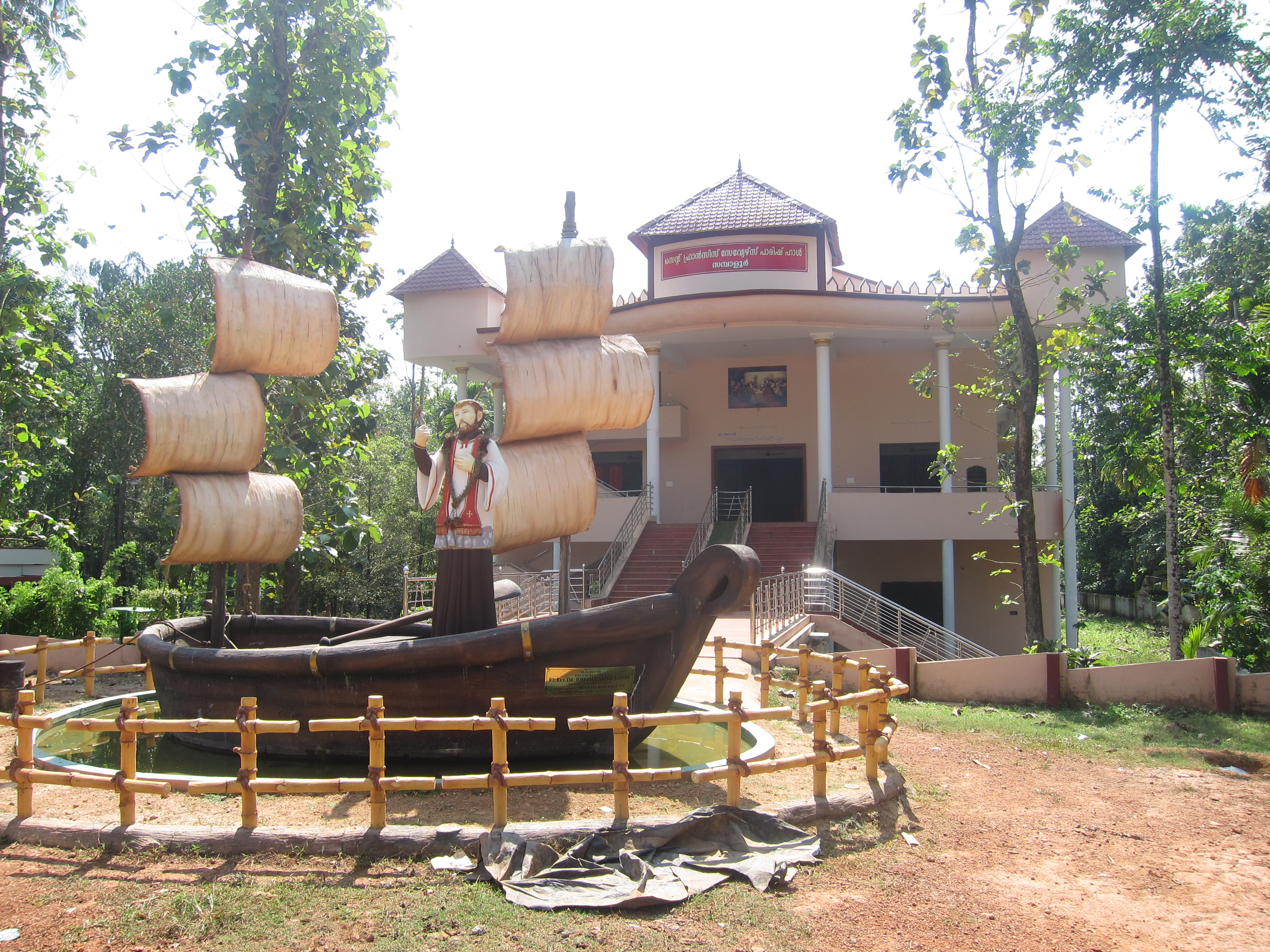
New Parish Hall

== See also ==
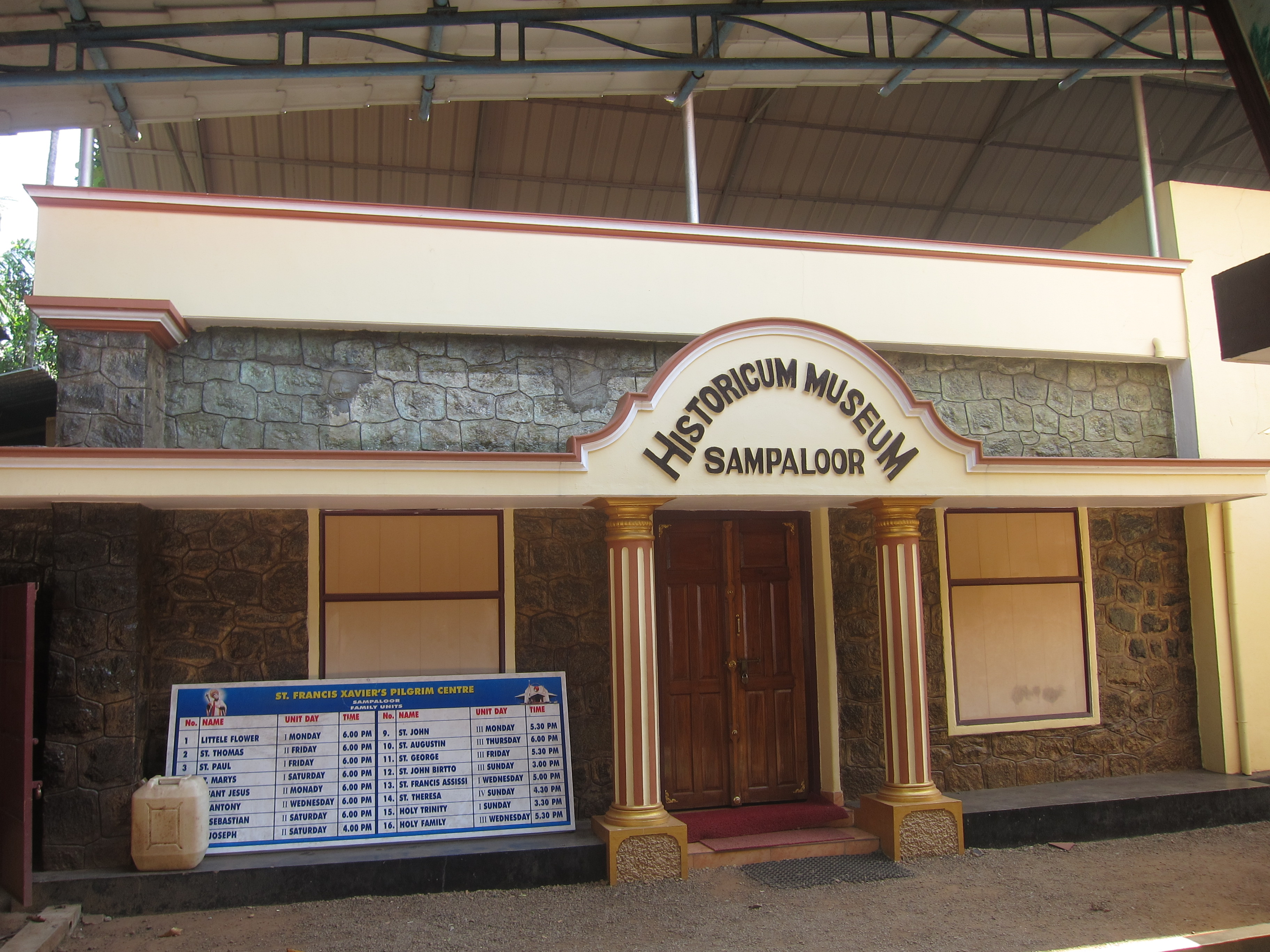
Historical Museum

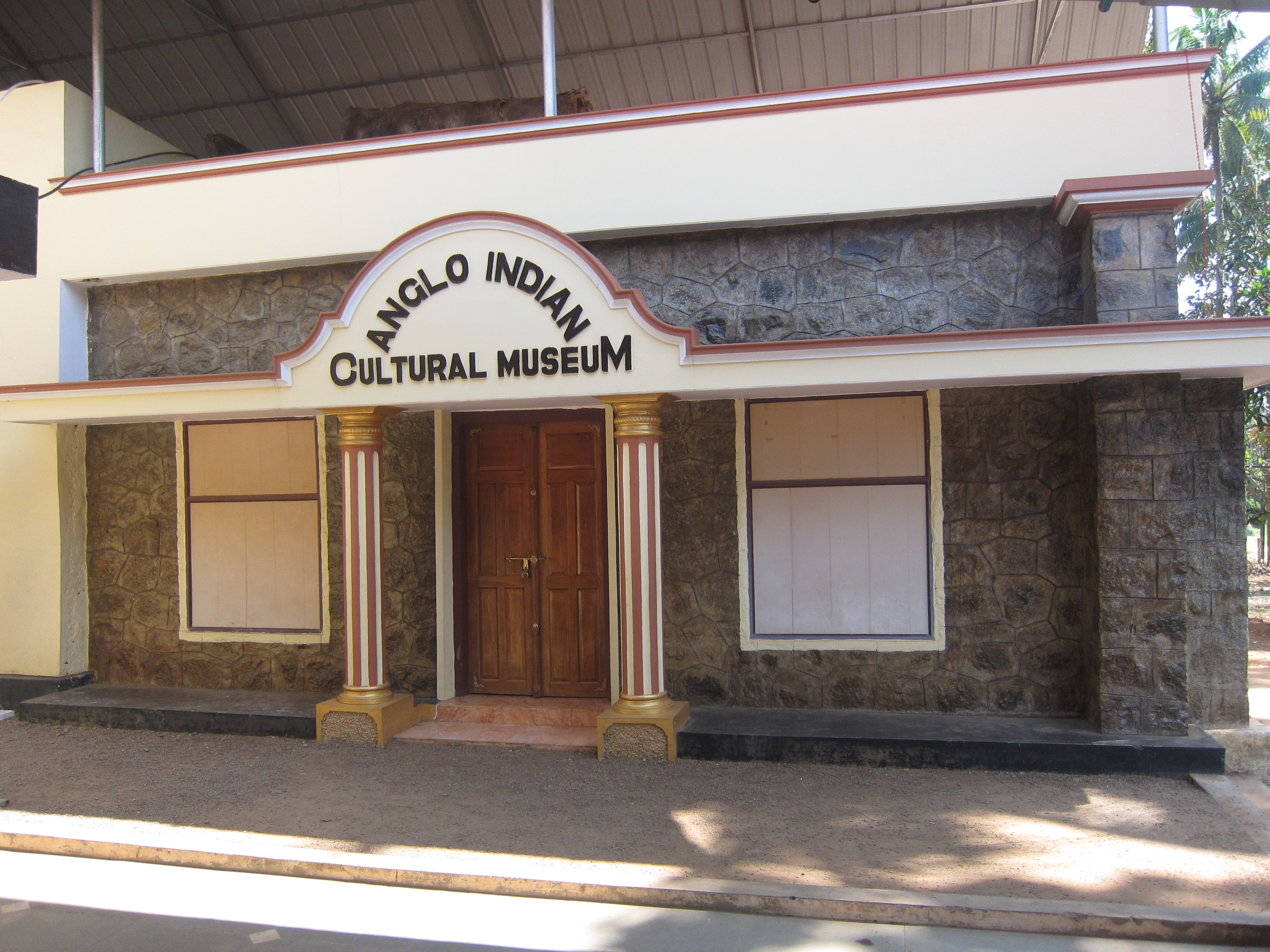
Anglo Indian Cultural Museum

- St. Francis Xavier Forane Church, Velur
