= Karuvathoor Sreeramaswami Temple =

Hindu temple in Thrissur district, Kerala, India

- Location in Kerala

Religion
- Affiliation: Hinduism
- District: Thrissur
- Deity: Rama
- Festival: Rama Navami

Location
- Location: Velur
- State: Kerala
- Country: India
- Coordinates: 10°37′43″N 76°09′07″E

Architecture
- Type: Architecture of Kerala

Specifications
- Temple: One
- Elevation: 38.76 m (127 ft)

Karuvathoor Sreeramaswami Temple is a Hindu temple at Kurumaldesam in the Velur panchayat of Thrissur district in the state of Kerala, India, near the Kurumal Sree Bhagawati Temple. Both temples function under the Cochin Devaswom Board. Renovation work was underway at the Karuvathoor temple as of 2022.

== Gallery ==
Front view	Side View	Pathway around sanctum sanctorum	Divine Granite Stones	Stairs of sanctum sanctorum
