= Pazhuvil =

Pazhuvil പഴുവിൽ
- Village
- Location in Kerala, India Pazhuvil (India)
- Coordinates: 10.413191°N 76.157860°E
- Country: India
- State: Kerala
- District: Thrissur

Languages
  - Official: Malayalam, English
- Time zone: UTC+5:30 (IST)
- Vehicle registration: KL-

Pazhuvil is a small village in Trissur district of Kerala state, south India. It is 17 km from Thrissur town, on the Cherpu - Triprayar road.

== Location ==
Pazhuvil village is very close to the city yet retains many qualities of an age old Kerala village. It has all modern facilities for dwellers (hospital, ancient temples, schools, church, Masjid, auditoriums, etc.). It is divided into east and west officially and is surrounded by paddy fields. Pazhuvil has four Major Hindu temples, Subrahmanian, Shiva (Vendrasseri), Vettaikkaran and Vishnumaaya Kutti Chathan and several other family owned temples.

The main centers are the Sree Gokulam Arts and Science College Junction, Chazhoor road junction, Hospital junction, Pazhuvil centre, Panchayat junction and Gayathri bus stop. There is an aided school (more than seventy years old) "St Antony's HSS" run by the church, and a private CBSE school along with college. Two Juma Masjid available in Pazhuvil. One situated near Pazhuvil Center and other on Pazhuvil West. St. Antony's Church made Pazhuvil very popular.

== Landmarks ==
The village has a mission hospital and a homeopathic hospital for the health care of the villagers. The government run veterinary hospital is nearly 50 years old and helps villagers to maintain their livestock. Aided school (St Antony's HSS). St Antony's Church.

== History ==
The Village was one of the early movers in the co-operative movement in the state. The Pazhuvil Service Co-operative Society is more than a century old. For many years villagers were depending on the bank run the society for their financial transactions. It is one of the leading co-operative banks of the district. The financial transactions of the NRI's also has helped the growth of the bank. The contribution of the bank to the farming.

=== Church history ===
The origin of Thattil family in Thrissur is linked with one of the army Chief of The King of Kochi. He was killed in a battle with Zamorin of Kozhikode at a place called Enamavu in Thrissur. As a mark of respect and memory of this great warrior, King promised to construct a church, where his body is buried. Accordingly, his body was buried in Pazhuvil in Thrissur and a church was constructed there. Velayanad church near Vellangallur is founded by Thattil Muthi. Thattil Clan, Which has its origin in the ancient Christian settlement of Pazhuvil located in the western part of Thrissur District, 17 km from the city in the Thrissur-Thriprayar Road. By virtue of its nobility and culture this family finds an important place among the 'Nazrani'-Thomas Christians of Kerala – families, legendarily claiming to be the descendants of those ancestors directly baptized by St. Thomas, one of the twelve Apostles of Lord Jesus Christ. Thattil Mapila who belonged to this clan and whose tomb is situated in the graveyard of Pazhuvil Catholic Church was built in the year 883 AD and catered to the spiritual needs of the Christians including those in Thrissur and its outskirts of the village is appreciable. The writer of Puthen pana, Arnos Padiri was lived and died here in Pazhuvil formerly Known as Pazhayoor "the land of fruits". The tomb of Arnos Padiri is situated in Pazhuvil. It has the credibility of the ancient churches in the Diocese of Trichur.

== Places of worships ==
- The village has an old Subramanian temple and "vendrasery shiva temple" "vellanchery kalinada kavu" Hindu temple with a temple pond for the devotees. The temple was scientifically analyzed to be around 2000 years old. 'SHASHTI' is the most prominent festival associated with the temple, during which a particular form of dancing, Kavadi aatam is performed. Shivrathri is a famous festival in " Vendrasery shiva temple " similarly Karthikathali and parayanthullal in "Vellanchery Kalinadakavu".
- St. Antony's_Church, Pazhuvil is a Catholic church and the first church in India named after St. Antony. It was founded in 960 AD. This church is one of several pilgrimage centers in Kerala. It is known for the feast of St. Antony on the second Sunday after Easter, celebrated at the old shrine nearby the river. The tomb of Johann_Ernst_Hanxleden also popularly known as Arnos Pathiri, who wrote Puthen Pana is at this church. The church, which was founded in 883 AD, also believed to the first church in India named after St. Antony.
- Pazhuvil Mosque is the only Sunni juma Masjid in the road side of Thrissur-Cherpu-Thriprayar Road.
- Pazhuvil West Juma Masjid is Sunni Mosque Situated at the Western Part.

== Notable people ==
- Johann Ernst Hanxleden, a Jesuit missionary from Germany (known locally as Arnos Pathiri) came to Kerala in the beginning of the 18th century. He died of a snake bite on 20 March 1732 and was buried near the church. A memorial was subsequently built and his remains were removed to the memorial. A historical museum has also been started.
