= Puthen Pana =

Poem by Johann Ernst Hanxleden

- by Arnos Pathiri
- Original title: പുത്തൻ പാന
- Written: Between 1721 and 1732
- Country: India - Velur, Thrissur, Kerala
- Language: Malayalam
- Subject: Life of Jesus Christ
- Genre(s): Religious poetry, Christian poetry
- Meter: Nathonatha, Sarpini
- Lines: 14 padams

Puthen Pana is a Malayalam poem written by the German Jesuit missionary priest Johann Ernst Hanxleden, famously known as Arnos Pathiri, in Kerala. The poem, composed between 1721 and 1732, narrates the life of Jesus Christ in a poetic format and is one of the earliest and most well-known Christian-themed works in Malayalam literature. Arnos Pathiri lived in St. Francis Xavier Forane Church, Velur ,Thrissur and is said to have written Puthen Pana.

The poem is recited by Kerala Christians during important religious occasions like Holy Week, Maundy Thursday, Good Friday, and Holy Saturday. One theory suggests that Arnos Pathiri escaped from St. Francis Xavier Forane Church, Velur, Thrissur after a toddy shop worker overheard a local plan to kill him and warned him, prompting his move to St. Antony's_Church, Pazhuvil, Thrissur, where he later died and was buried. St. Antony's_Church, Pazhuvil, Thrissur —believed to be the first church in India named after St. Antony and traditionally dated to 883 AD—houses the tomb of Arnos Pathiri.

== Structure and Content ==
Puthen Pana consists of 14 padams (sections), each narrating key events in the life of Jesus Christ:

- The first padam mentions that the poem was composed at the request of Antonio Pimental, the Archbishop of Cranganore.
- The second padam discusses the Fall of Man.
- Subsequent sections cover biblical events like the Annunciation, Nativity of Jesus, the Sermon on the Mount, the Last Supper, and the Crucifixion.
- The 12th padam is especially significant, portraying the lament of Virgin Mary at the crucifixion.
- The final two padams describe the Resurrection and Ascension.

The 12th padam is composed in the metre Nathonatha, while the others use the Sarpini metre.

== Legacy ==
Puthen Pana is one of the first Malayalam poems written on Christianity and remains widely recited by Christian communities in Kerala during Lent and Holy Week. It is considered a masterpiece of early Malayalam Christian literature and is studied for its literary and religious significance. Efforts have been made to preserve the text online.

== See also ==
- Kristubhagavatam – a modern Sanskrit epic about Jesus Christ
- Indian poetry
- Arnos Pathiri
- Christianity in India
