= Johann Ernst Hanxleden =

German Jesuit priest (1681–1732)

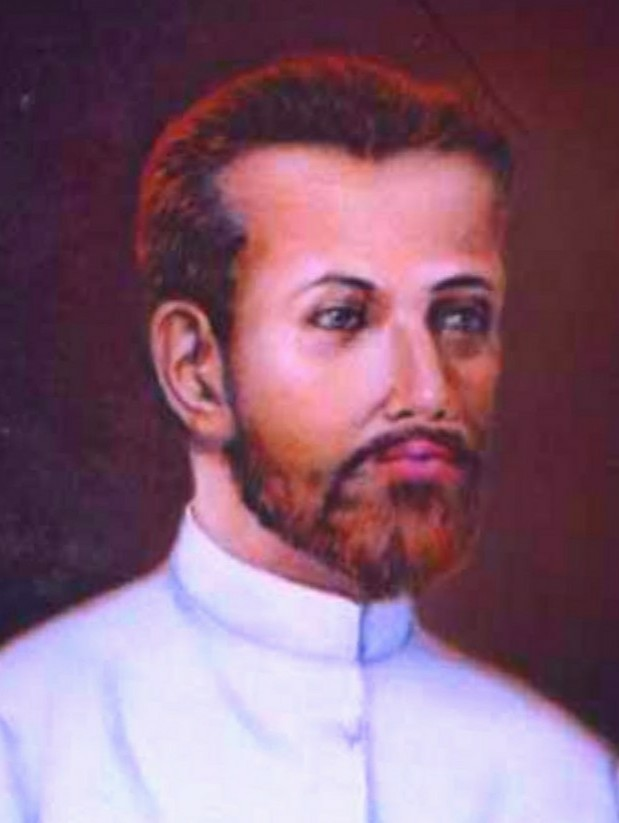
- Arnos Pathiri
- Born: 1681; Ostercappeln, Lower Saxony, Germany
- Died: 1732 (aged 50–51); Pazhuvil, Thrissur, Kerala, India
- Resting place: Pazhuvil, Thrissur
- Other name: Arnos Pathiri
- Occupations: Jesuit priest, missionary, poet, grammarian, lexicographer, philologist
- Notable work: Puthen Pana; Malayalam–Portuguese Dictionary; Malayalavyaakaranam; Sidharoopam

Johann Ernst Hanxleden (1681–1732), also known as Arnos Pathiri, was a German Jesuit priest and missionary, best known for his contributions as a Malayalam and Sanskrit poet and philologist. He lived in India for most of his life and became a scholar of Sanskrit and Malayalam languages before authoring Puthen Pana, a poem on the life of Jesus Christ, Malayalam–Portuguese Dictionary (the first dictionary in Malayalam), as well as two linguistic treatises, Malayalavyaakaranam and Sidharoopam.

Arnos Pathiri lived in St. Francis Xavier Forane Church, Velur, Thrissur, in Kerala. He also established Pazhayangadi Church, under St. Francis Xavier Forane. He is also very prominent in Pazhuvil, Thrissur.

== Early life ==
Johann Ernst Hanxleden was born at Ostercappeln, near Osnabrück, in Lower Saxony, Germany in 1681. (Note: Some reports mention the year of birth as 1680.) While studying philosophy at his home town of Osnabrück, he met Wilhelm Weber, a Jesuit priest who volunteered to serve as a part of the Jesuit mission in Malabar. On 30 October 1699 he set out on a long journey to India, along with Weber and another Jesuit priest, Wilhelm Meyr. They travelled through Italy, the Ottoman Empire, Syria, Armenia, and Persia to reach Surat (in present-day Gujarat), India on 13 December 1700. (Note: Franz Kaspar Schillinger, a doctor and fellow passenger later gave the account of this dangerous journey and reported that Weber and Meyr died during the transit.) During the journey, he entered into a novitiate. From Surat he proceeded to Goa, where there was a large community of Jesuits.

== Life in India ==
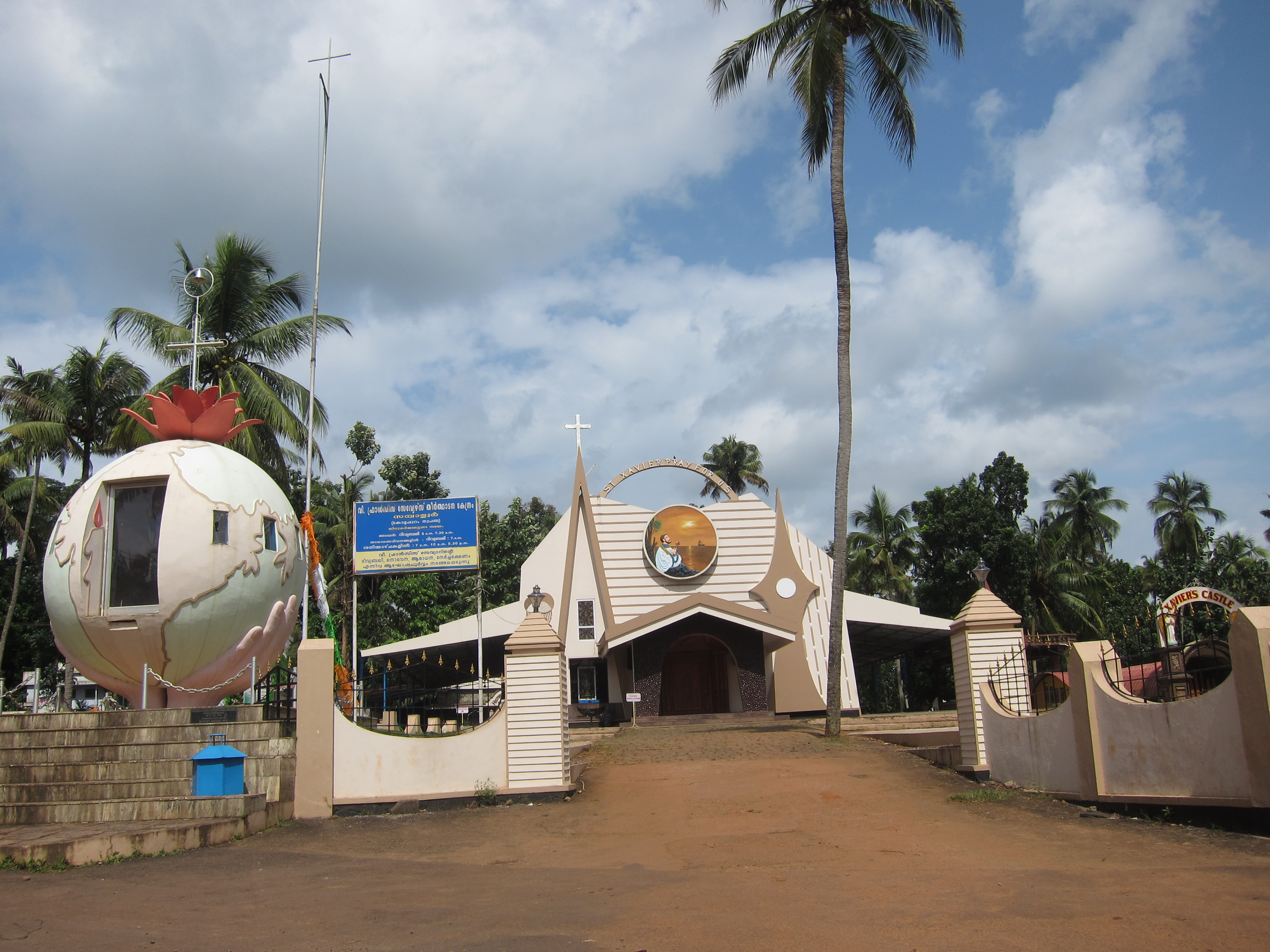
Sampaloor Church

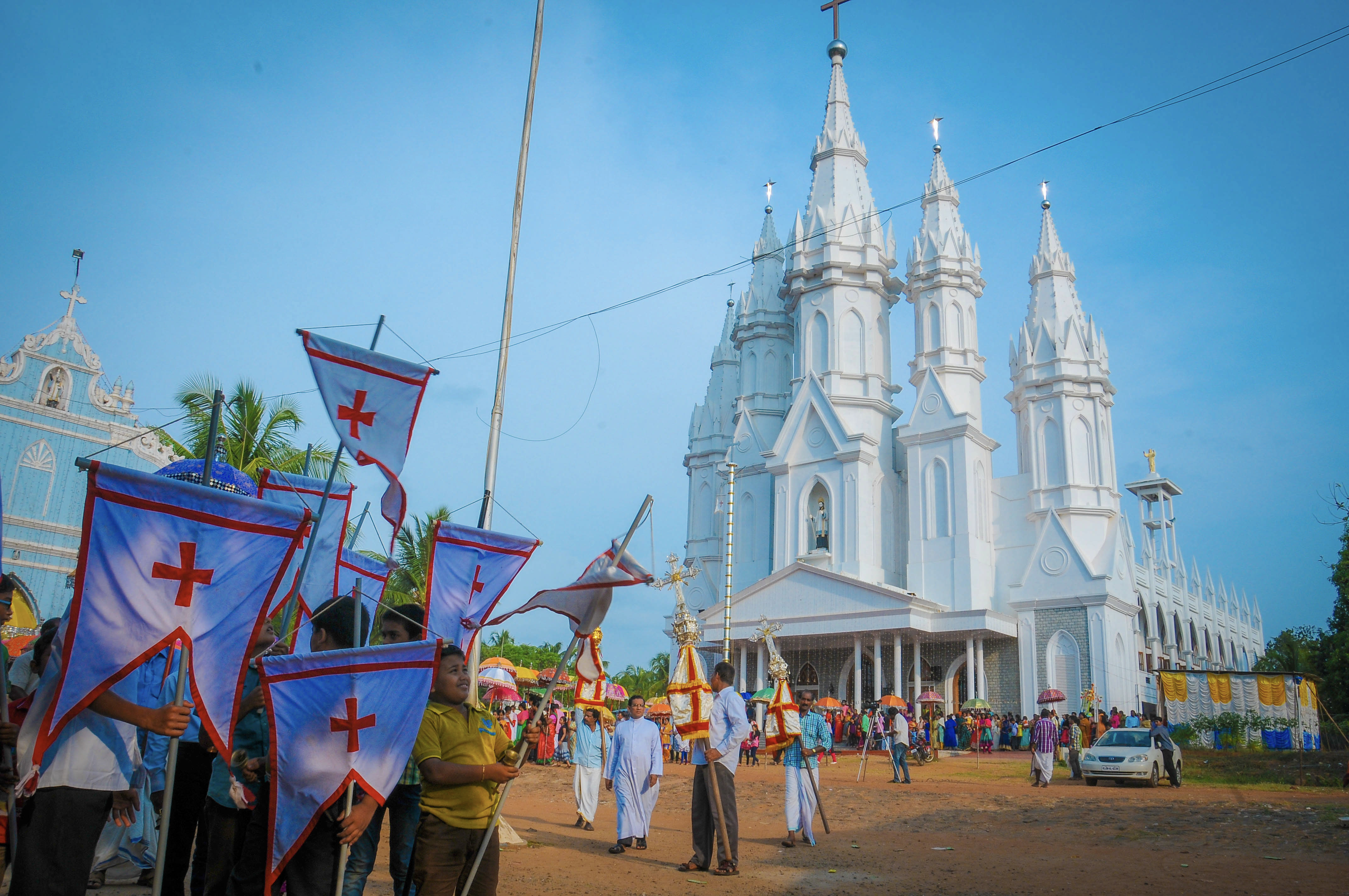
St. Francis Xavier Forane Church, Velur founded by Arnos Pathiri

After completing his novitiate in Goa, Hanxleden was sent to a Jesuit seminary, St. Paul's, at Sampaloor in the Thrissur District of the south Indian state of Kerala. (Note: The remains of the seminary where Hanxleden did his priestly studies in Sampaloor and the church are preserved as a historical monument at St. Francis Xavier's Church, Sampaloor. The word Sampallor has got its origin from 'san-paul-ur', means land of St. Paul. It was the Jesuit priests who have given this name to this land which is called as Ambazhakad to commemorate St. Paul the Apostle of Jesus who travelled at length from middle East to the western Europe to preach the Gospel. It is also assumed that Jesuits had great reverence to Pope Paul III who approved the Plan of St. Ignatius of Lyola to form a congregation by name "Society of Jesus"in 1540 by the bull "Formula of the Institute".) There he did his theological studies, preparing himself to receive priesthood. He took time also to initiate himself to the local language, Malayalam, as well as Syriac, the liturgical language of Kerala's Thomas Christians. He was ordained priest in 1706. In addition to his mother tongue German, and his mastery of Malayalam, he also had a good command over Latin, Syriac, Portuguese, Sanskrit, and Tamil.

After moving to Palayoor, Hanxleden studied Sanskrit and improved his Malayalam, learning under the tutelage of Namboodiri scholars such as Kunjan and Krishnan from Angamaly and Thekkemadom from Thrissur. From 1707 to 1711, he served as secretary to John Ribeiro, the then Archbishop of Cranganore and visited many places in Kerala on tasks such as preaching and Catechesis. He also served as the vicar of the main church in Malabar. Later, he moved to Velur, Thrissur, a small village near Thrissur District in 1712 and built the Velur Forane Church.

From 1729 onward, he spent his time between Velur, Sampaloor, Palayoor and finally Pazhuvil, where he suffered a snake bite which resulted in his death on 20 March 1732, at the age of 51. One theory suggests that Arnos Pathiri escaped from St. Francis Xavier Forane Church, when some locals were trying to kill him. A woman worker in a toddy shop overheard and reported this to Arnos, leading him to escape from the church and go to St. Antony's Church, Thrissur, where he eventually died and where his tomb is located. When a memorial was built outside the church, his remains were transferred to it. The memorial today houses a historical museum.

== Legacy ==
The church and his home in Velur have since been declared as a protected monument by the Government of Kerala. Among various exhibits at the museum are the bed used by Hanxleden and the chathurangam (which Hanxleden used to play) columns marked on the floor of his home. Mar Francis Vazhapilly, Metropolitan Archbishop of Thrissur from 1921 to 1942, used to stay at the Velur Forane Church for a few days during Lent so that he could sleep on the bed used by Arnos Paathiri and drink from the well dug during his times.

His life has been documented in books by many authors, such as A. Adappur, a Catholic priest, Mathew Ulakamthara, N. K. Jose, and C. K. Mattam.

== Translation of Name ==
=== 1. Ernst → Arnose ===
German: Johann Ernst Hanxleden

In German, “Ernst” is pronounced something like “AIRNST” (with a slightly rolled R).

When rendered in Malayalam, with Dravidian phonology and the limitations of local script and tongue, it would often become:

Ernst → Arnos / Arnose / Arnas The final “t” sound often gets softened or omitted. "r" and "n" can blur due to Malayalam phonetics. "s" endings are more natural than abrupt consonants like “t” in Malayalam speech. Conclusion: The transformation from Ernst to Arnose is both phonetically plausible and culturally natural.

=== 2. Father → Pathiri ===
In Malayalam: പാതിരി (Pathiri) is the commonly used word for “Father” in the Catholic Christian context. Derived from the Portuguese “Padre” (as were many early ecclesiastical terms in Kerala). The pronunciation naturally evolved to Pathiri in Malayalam due to local phonetics.

=== 3. Combined Name: Arnose Pathiri ===
Arnose = local rendering of his given name (Ernst) Pathiri = his title, or how people addressed him as a priest Thus, “Arnose Pathiri” simply means “Fr. Ernst” in the affectionate, localized voice of 18th-century Kerala. It wasn't a formal name he chose—it was a name the people gave him, much like a form of inculturation or linguistic baptism.

== Works ==
Arnos Pathiri's oeuvre comprises poems, dictionaries and grammar books; His most prominent literary works are Puthen Pana and Chathuranthyam.

=== Puthen Pana ===
The Puthen Pana, a Malayalam epic on the life of Jesus Christ, is Arnos Pathiri's most popular poem and it is one of the earliest poems written in simple Malayalam. It has been an inalienable part of Christian (not restricted to Catholic) life in Kerala since the time of its composition; its paadhams are sung in a characteristic manner in Christian households on various solemn occasions, the most notable ones being Holy Thursday, Good Friday, and other days of Holy Week and Lent and evenings preceding funerals. It is reported that he wrote Puthen Pana sitting by the well of Pazhuvil Forane church.

The poem follows a similar style to the Jnanappana of Poonthanam Nambudiri. It consists of fourteen Paadhams; the couplets are written in the Sarppini Vruththam, except for those in the twelfth Paadham, which are in the Nathonnatha metre. The twelfth Paadham on the lament of the Virgin Mary at the crucifixion and death of Jesus is the heart of the poem. Other important Paadhams are concerned with the Fall of Man (second), the Annunciation (fourth), the Nativity (fifth), the Sermon on the Mount (seventh), the Last Supper (tenth), the trial and Crucifixion (eleventh), the Resurrection (thirteenth), and the Ascension (fourteenth). The first paadham has the poet telling us that the poem is being written on request from Antonio Pimental, the Archbishop of Cranganore, who held the ecclesiastical office from 1721 to 1752. The poem is estimated to have been composed some time during the period 1721–1732.

=== Chathuranthyam ===
The Chathuranthyam is a mystic poem on the four ends of man: Maranam, Vidhi, Moksham and Narakam. Parts of the poem are sung on occasions similar to the Puththenpaana recitals. While his poems are written works, they also have a strong oral tradition; many pious Christians learn his poetry by heart for recitals.

=== Malayalam–Portuguese Dictionary ===
Pathiri was the first to compile a Malayalam dictionary and his lexicon described Malayalam words in both Sanskrit and Portuguese.

=== Others ===
Pathiri was the first European to write a Sanskrit grammar Grammatica grandonica and also the first European to compose Sanskrit verse. He also wrote a short and succinct grammar for the Malayalam language. Along with his predecessor, Heinrich Roth, he was one of the pioneering European Sanskrit scholars, and he has written several essays on the Ramayana and Mahabharata, in Latin. Marana Parvam, Vidhi Parvam, Moksha Parvam, Naraka Parvam, Umma Parvam, Misiha Charitham, and Jehova Parvam are some of his other works.

The Arnos Padre Academy, based in Velur, was established in his memory. The academy has taken steps to get his writings translated into English with the help of European scholars.

== Selected works ==
- Arnos Pathiri (1966). Puthan pana.
- Chathuranthyam
- Genevieva Punyacharithram
- Ummaadaey Dhukhkham
- Arnos Pathiri (1988). Malayalam Portuguese nighandu. Kerala Sahitya Academy.
- Malayalavyaakaranam
- Samskrutham – Portuguese Dictionary
- Samskruthavyaakaranam
- Ave Maris Stella
- Arṇos Pāthir̲i; Rāghavan Piḷḷa, K. (1960). Koodāśappāna (in Malayalam). Thiruvananthapuraṃ: Ōr̲iental Mānuscr̲ipt̲s Library. OCLC 7276032.
- Arnos Pathiri. Arnos Pathiriyude Padya Krithikal (PDF). Fr. S. Thermadam.
- Arnos Pathiri (1931). Narakaparvam (PDF). Bharathavilasam Press and Book Depot. Archived from the original (PDF) on 19 April 2019.
- Arnos Pathiri. Umaparvam (PDF). Bharathavilasam Press and Book Depot. p. 63. Archived from the original (PDF) on 19 April 2019.

== See also ==
- Hermann Gundert
- V. Nagel
- George Mathan
- List of Malayalam-language authors by category
- List of Malayalam-language authors
