= St. Antony's Church, Pazhuvil =

Syro-Malabar church in Kerala, India

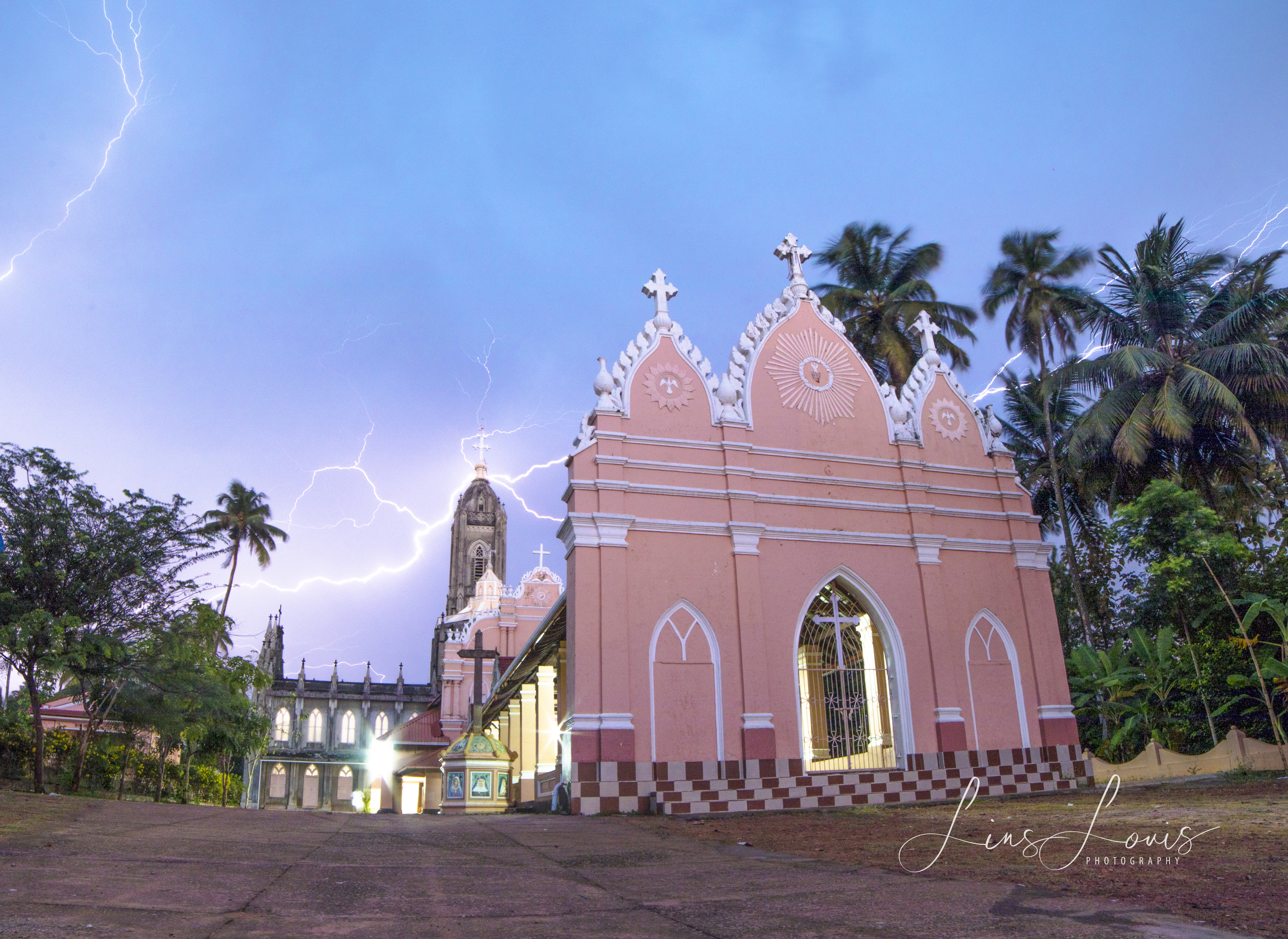

St. Antony's Forane Church is a Syro-Malabar Catholic church and the first church in India named after St. Antony. It was founded in 883 AD. This church is one of the famous pilgrimage centers in Kerala. It is renowned for the feast of St. Joseph on March 19.

The origin of Thattil family in Thrissur is linked with one of the army Chief of The King of Kochi. He was killed in a battle with Zamorin of Kozhikode at a place called Enamavu in Thrissur. As a mark of respect and memory of this great warrior, King promised to construct a church, where his body is buried. Accordingly, his body was buried in Pazhuvil in Thrissur and a church was constructed there.

Thattil Clan, Which has its origin in the ancient Christian settlement of Pazhuvil Located in the western part of Thrissur District, 17 km from the city in the Thrissur-Thriprayar Road. By virtue of its nobility and culture this family finds an important place among the ‘Nazrani’-Thomas Christians of Kerala – families, legendarily claiming to be the descendants of those ancestors directly baptized by St. Thomas, one of the twelve Apostles of Lord Jesus Christ. Thattil Mapila who belonged to this clan and whose tomb is situated in the graveyard of Pazhuvil Catholic Church was built in the year 883 AD and catered to the spiritual needs of the Christians including those in Thrissur and its outskirts. Ollur is only one of the chapel of Pazhuvil Forane Church at that time. Arnos Pathiri ( Johann Ernst Hanxleden ) poem writer of Puthen Pana (പുത്തൻ പാന) buried here in1732. The tomb of Arnos Pathiri is here.
