= Mathew Ulakamthara =

Indian Malayalam language poet and literary critic (1931–2022)

- Born: V. Mathew; 6 June 1931; Arattukulam, Vaikom, Travancore, British India
- Died: 24 February 2022 (aged 90); Thellakam, Kottayam district
- Citizenship: India
- Education: University of Kerala; University of Madras
- Occupations: writer, academic
- Spouse: Thresiamma
- Children: 4
- Parent(s): Ulakamthra Varkey; Anna
- Writing career
- Genres: poetry, literary criticism
- Notable work: Christu Gadha
- Notable awards: Sabha Rathnam

Mathew Ulakamthara was a Malayalam language writer, literary critic and academic from Kerala, India. He received several awards including Sabha Rathnam, the highest honour of the Syro-Malabar Church.

== Biography ==
Mathew Ulakamthara was born on 6 June 1931, in Chungam Ulakamthara house in present-day Arattukulam in Vaikom, Kottayam district of Kerala to Anna of Varkey of the Ulakamthara family. In 1954, he obtained a degree in Malayalam from the University of Kerala and later did his Post Graduate Degree from the University of Madras. He served as Malayalam lecturer at Thevara SH College for three decades and retired as head of the department in 1986. After retirement he worked as teacher at Mananthavady Newman's College. He was later appointed Honorary Professor of Sree Sankaracharya Sanskrit University. He also served as the sub-editor of Thananthu magazine and Editor-in-Chief of Deepika Weekly (1988-1990).

Mathew has also served as the Chief Examiner, Chairman of the Examination Board, Textbook Committee Member, Oriental Faculty and chairman of the Board of Studies of Kerala and MG Universities.

=== Personal life and death ===
Mathew was an Eastern Rite Catholic affiliated with the Syro-Malabar Church. He and his wife Thresiamma have four children. He died on 24 February 2022, at a private hospital in Thellakam, Kottayam district.

== Literary contributions ==
When he was 12 years old, his first work was published in Deepika Weekly Children's page. At the time of writing the articles in Kerala Pamkthi magazine under the name Vaikkom V. Mathew, its editor, Father C. K. Mattam, suggested that the family name be added to his name. After that he started writing under the name Mathew Ulakamthara.

Mathew has authored over fifty works in various genres including Literary Criticism, Poetry, Drama, Biography and Religious Thought. His introductions to the works of many authors including Vaikom Muhammad Basheer, Pala Narayanan Nair and Mary John Thottam are also noteworthy. These will be published in book form soon.

Mathew's main literary work is the epic Christugatha (meaning: The Story of Christ), which is a poem that gives a comprehensive and aesthetic account of the life and teachings of Jesus Christ from his birth to his ascension to heaven. Six editions of this book have been released. He has also authored several Christian devotional songs. His literary criticism books have been made textbooks by three universities in Kerala. The books used as texts were Vimarshasopanam, Alochanamritham, and Sahithyapeedika.

Mathew has been a member of the Kerala Sahitya Akademi, Secretary of the Kerala Sasthra Sahithya Parishad and a member of the advisory board of the Kerala Bhasha Institute.

== Selected works ==
=== Christian philosophy ===
- Pianius, Clement; Ulakamthara, Mathew (1980). Samshepavedartham (in Malayalam) (2 ed.). Kottayam: DC Books. OCLC 10752451.

=== Poetry ===
- Christugatha
- Velichathinte Makal (meaning: Daughter of Light)
- Adyathe Maranam (meaning: First Death)

=== Literary criticism ===
- Vimarshasopanam
- Ulakamthara, Mathew (1971). Alochanamrutham (in Malayalam). OCLC 31122740.
- Sahityapeedika (in Malayalam). Kottayam: DC Books. 1984.

=== Religious ===
- Ulakamthara, Mathew (1970). Vishwaprakasam: padyanatakam (in Malayalam). OCLC 39769351. (meaning: Universal light). Poetic Drama on life of Jesus Christ.
- Veerambana Kathakal
- Ulakamthara, Mathew (2001). Haindavam Christavam (in Malayalam) (2 ed.). Merit Books. OCLC 51264368. (meaning: Hinduism and Christianity)
- Mar Apreminte Mariya Geethangal
- Christu Bimbangal Malayalathil (meaning: Christ Images in Malayalam)
- Bharatham:Karnaparvam (in Malayalam). Kottayam: Sahitya Pravarthaka Co-operative Society. 1984.

=== Biography ===
- I.C. Chacko (in Malayalam). Thiruvananthapuram: Department of Culture, Government of Kerala. 1995. ISBN 978-8186365441. OCLC 35743099.
- Arnos Pathiri (in Malayalam). Thiruvananthapuram: Kerala History Association. 1982. OCLC 17608738. Based on life of Johann Ernst Hanxleden.
- Thomma Kattanar, Paremmakkal; Kariyatti, Ausep; Ulakamthara, Mathew (1983). Varthamana Pusthakam athava Roma Yathra (in Malayalam). Kottayam: DC Books. OCLC 14240329.
- Indira Gandhi, life of former Indian Prime Minister Indira Gandhi

=== Essays ===
- Kaippum Maduravum (in Malayalam). Kottayam: DC Books. 1981. (meaning: Bitter and Sweet)

=== Others ===
- Ulkkazhchakal (in Malayalam). Thevara: Janatha. 1992.
- Bheerukkalude Swargam (in Malayalam). Vaikom: Prathibha publication. 1982. (meaning: Heaven of Cowards)

== Awards and honours ==
- K. V. Simon Award
- A.K.C.C. Award
- Athansius Award
- Marthoma Award
- Vanisseri Award
- Ulloor Award
- Mahakavi Kattakkayam Gold Medal
- KCBC Award
- Catholic Congress Award
- KCYM Award
- Kudumbadeepam Award
- LRC Award
- Sr Mary Baneenja Award
- IC Chacko Award
- Syro-Malabar Research Center Award 2011
- In 2019, he received the title Sabha Rathnam (meaning: gem of the church) the highest honor of the Syro-Malabar Church.

== Works on him ==
- Manalil, Paul (2001). Ulakamtara, kaviyum nirupakanum: patanangal (in Malayalam). OCLC 48870951. (meaning: Ulakamthara, poet and critic:studies). Study on works of Mathew Ulakamthara.
