= Kadukutty =

- village
- Location in Kerala, India Kadukutty (India)
- Coordinates: 10°16′0″N 76°18′0″E
- Country: India
- State: Kerala
- District: Thrissur

Languages
  - Official: Malayalam, English
- Time zone: UTC+5:30 (IST)
- Vehicle registration: KL-64

Kadukutty is a village and Gram panchayat in the Chalakudy block in the Thrissur district, state of Kerala, India. It is surrounded by the Chalakudy river on three sides.

== Education ==
Kadukutty is a village with 100% literacy. There are two primary schools and two pre-primary schools. For health care, there is a Hospital, St. Joseph Hospital,(by CSN Sisters) which is having all the primary requisites in case of emergency.

== Transportation ==
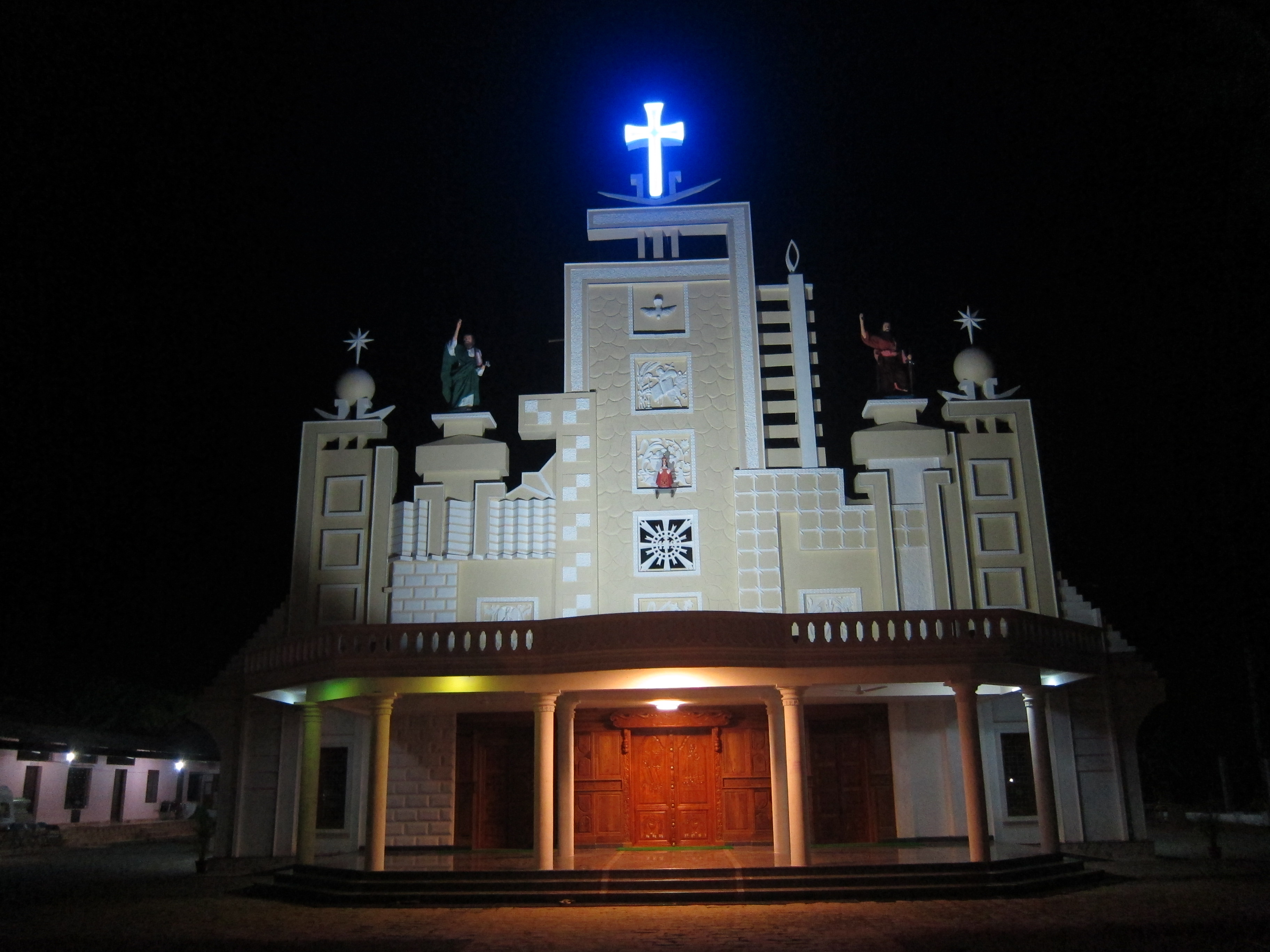
Kadukutty Church കാടുകുറ്റി പള്ളി

Nearby rail way stations include Chalakudy (9 km), Muringoor(5 km), Koratty(5 km). Near by KSRTC stand is Chalakudy (7 km). Kadukutty is 5 km away from NH 47. The Divine retreat center Muringoor, Church of Koratty Muthy, and Karimpanakkavu Temple veluppilly ayyappa temple are close to Kadukutty.

== Culture ==
The first printing press in India made by European priests and the remains of St Pauls church shot down by Tippu Sulthans Army exist here. Portuguese Indians settled here after Dutch Invasion in Cochin. Remains of Jesuit seminary and old Latin church where St John Britto and St Francis Xavier had said holy mass still remain here. "Thembavani" written by Arnos Padre was printed in St Pauls press in Sanpaloor. There are two library council affiliated libraries also, at Grameena vayanasala Annanad (R1057) and Panambilly smaraka vayanasala. There is a film society functioning with the affiliation of federation of film societies of India, named as Frames film society. One of the main festivals is St. Francis Xavier's Feast at St. Francis Xavier Church Sanpaloor. Velupilli Uthram vilakku.

Arangali Manappuram is a sandbank on the Chalakudy River, located in Kadukutty Panchayath of Thrissur district. It is also the largest and the still surviving sandbank of Chalakudy River. Till around five years ago, the Manappuram had been the venue of Arangali Fest, a week-long cultural festival organised under the initiative of the local Panchayath, with artistes from the locality and outside. Kulayidam (south end) & Cheruvaloor are major villages of Kadukutty Punchayath.
