= Sampaloor =

Village in Kerala, India

Sampaloor is a small village located in Kadukutty panchayat of Chalakudy Taluk in Kerala state, India. It is believed that the name 'Sampaloor' was originated from 'São - Paulo - oor' ( the land of St. Paul). During the Portuguese rule, Sampaloor was an important center of Jesuits.
