= St. Francis Xavier Forane Church, Velur =

Catholic church in Velur, India

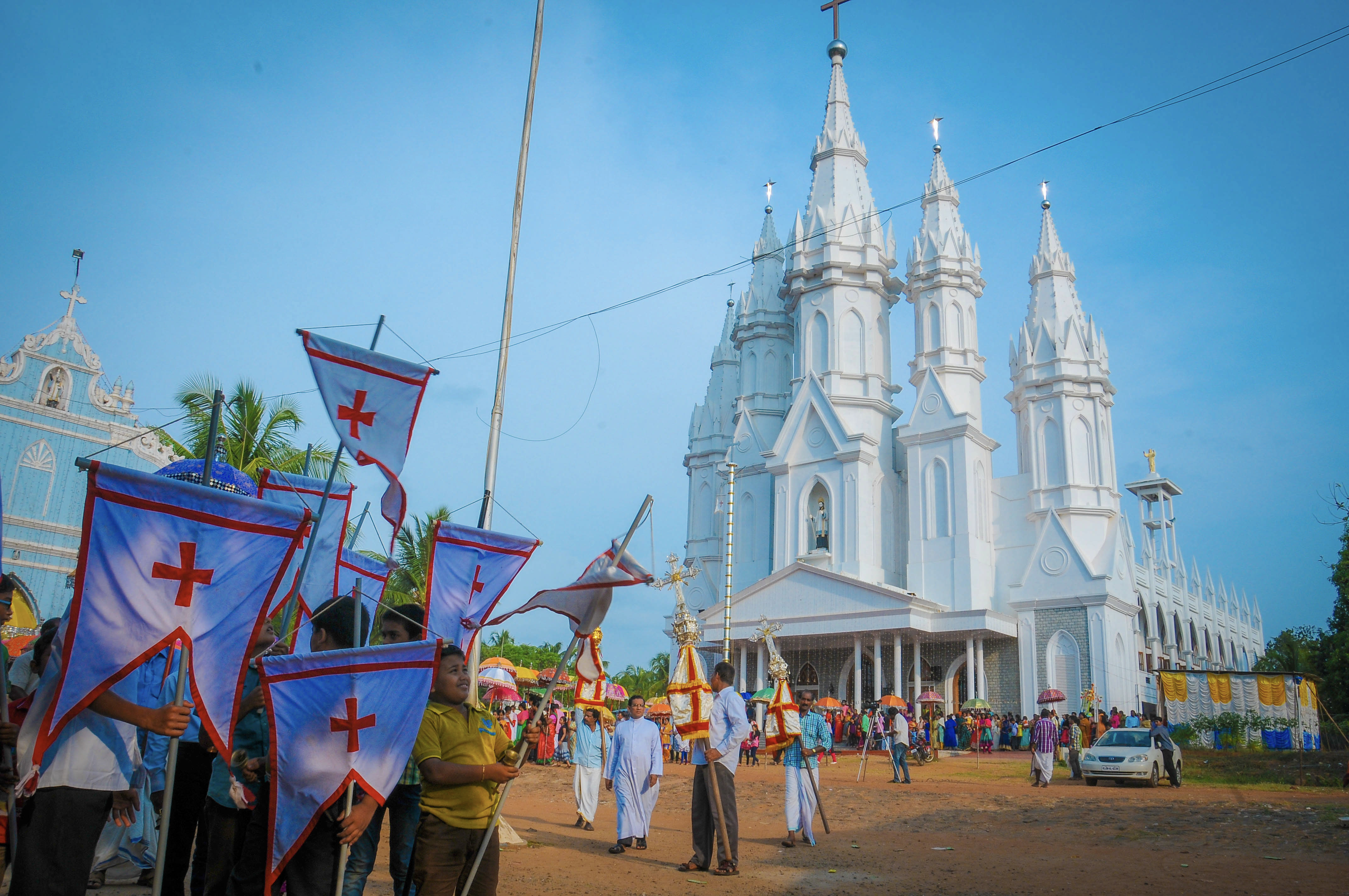
- St. Francis Xavier Forane Church, Velur

Religion
- Affiliation: Catholic
- Diocese: Thrissur
- Year consecrated: 1712; 314 years ago

Location
- Location: (India) Velur, Thrissur, Kerala
- State: Kerala
- Interactive map of St. Francis Xavier Forane Church, Velur

Architecture
- Dome: 1

Website
- www.arnoschurchvelur.com

St. Francis Xavier Forane Church is at the center of Velur, Kerala, India. It is a Syro-Malabar Catholic Church, and a protected monument in the Archdiocese of Thrissur with considerable antiquity and spiritual heritage. Historically this Forane church has been the mother church of many parishes. Four Forane divisions have come into existence out of this church.

The church's founder, Fr. Johann Ernst Hanxleden, who is popularly known as Arnos Padiri, wrote the first Malayalam – Portuguese Encyclopedia He was a Jesuit priest from Germany. It is believed that the Velur church was founded on 3 December 1712 in honor of St. Francis Xavier.
