= Velur, Thrissur =

Velur Veloor
- village
- Location in Kerala, India Velur (India)
- Coordinates: 10°38′36.4014″N 76°9′44.553″E
- Country: India
- State: Kerala
- District: Thrissur

Area
  - Total: 28.32 km^{2} (10.93 sq mi)

Population (2001)
  - Total: 22,155
  - Density: 782.3/km^{2} (2,026/sq mi)

Languages
  - Official: Malayalam, English
- Time zone: UTC+5:30 (IST)
- PIN: 680601
- Telephone code: 04885
- Sex ratio: 0.89 ♂/♀
- Literacy: 90.15%

Velur or Veloor is a village and panchayat in Kunnamkulam Taluk, Thrissur district, Kerala, India with a population of 22,155. Other places close to Velur are Kechery, Wadakkanchery etc.

== History ==
This village was a part of Chengazhinad (one of the 18 states of Cochin Kingdom) under rule of Chengazhi Nambiar or (Chengazhi Nambi).

=== Historical struggles ===
- Fr. Johann Ernst Hanxleden,[2] who is popularly known as Arnos Pathiri, who written the first Malayalam - Portuguese Encyclopedia [3] This Jesuit priest from Germany has given his energy not only to Velur but to the whole world through his literary works. It is believed that the Velur church was founded by Arnos Pathiri about three centuries ago on 3 December 1712 in honour of St. Francis Xavier.
- Velur kanal Samaram-1948. Velur Kanal Samaram was conducted by the Communist Party against the cruel treatment and exploitation of the labourers by the person who had undertaken the work of constructing a canal from the Vazhani Dam reservoir for irrigation. Some of the leaders of this historic struggle that helped in the growth of Communist Party in the area were A.S.N. Nambissan (former M.L.A.), C.P. Francis and K.S. Sankaran.
- Marumarakkal Samaram in Velur Manimalarkavu-1952

== Transport ==
Transport is provided by State owned Kerala State Road Transport Corporation and private transport bus operators. Road transport is also supported by private taxis and autorickshaws also called autos.

Auto Rikshaws available at Post Office centre, Chungam, Pazhaya Post Office, Thandilam Road, Puliyannur, Thayyur State Highway 76 pass through Velur. SH 76 Kuranchery - Velur - Kechery Road. 12.838 km . Direct bus available from Thrissur Shakthan stand, Wadakanchery Ottupara bus stand, Guruvayur, Kunnamkulam, Kechery(6 km).

The nearest railhead is Wadakkanchery 13 km, Other nearest railway stations are Thrissur (20 km), Shoranur (28 km), and Guruvayur (15 km).

Nearest Airports:

- Cochin International Airport (Nedumabassery airport) (nearly 75 km)
- Calicut International Airport (nearly 100 km)

== Places of worship ==
=== St. Francis Xavier Forane Church ===
Velur is centered around the St. Francis Xavier Forane Syro-Malabar Catholic Church, which is a protected monument in the Archdiocese of Thrissur with considerable antiquity and spiritual heritage. Historically this Forane church has been the mother church of many parishes. Four Forane divisions have come into existence out of this church. The fame of the church is closely linked with the fame of its founder, Fr. Johann Ernst Hanxleden, who is popularly known as Arnos Padiri., who wrote the first Malayalam - Portuguese Encyclopedia This Jesuit priest from Germany has given his energy not only to Velur but to the whole world through his literary works. It is believed that the Velur church was founded by Arnos Padiri about three centuries ago on 3 December 1712 in honor of St. Francis Xavier. Recently a new Church is constructed near the old church.

=== Manimalarkavu temple ===
Manimalarkavu temple (one of the 18 royal temples (Pathinettara Kavu) under Cochin Kingdom) is a major place of worship for Hindus in Velur. "Manimalarkavu pooram" festival (or Kumra Bharani usually it falls between 15 February to 10 March) is one of the major attractions of tourists as it is colourful by the man-made horses of very huge sizes, which is rarely seen in other places. These man made horses (considers the daughter of the goddess) representing from each small localities (desham ) from this village (including from some neighbouring villages) and this festival is known as Kumbha Bharani Vela( Kuthira vela, No any animals used in this festival like Elephant). During these days many devi (goddess) temples in Kerala celebrating the yearly festivals in different ways.

=== Other places of worship ===
There are many other worship places in Velur village. They are mainly Cheramankadu ayyapan temple, Velur Karthiani temple, Kandamkolangara Shiva temple, Cherunthala Shiva temple, Kurur Krishna temple, Kurumal Sree Bhagavathi Temple, Kurumal Karuvathoor Sree Ramaswami Temple, Kuttikattukolangare Devi temple, pazhavoor Ayyappan Kavu Temple, Pazhavoor Sree Kottayil Bagavathy Temple, Nelluvai Dhanwandhari Temple, Thayyur Nithya Sahaya Matha Church, Thayyoor Subramaniyaswami Temple, Thayyoor Lothykavu Temple, St. Antoney's church Thandilum, Sree Rama Swami Temple Vellatanjur, Santhanagopalamurthy Temple Kuruvannur, Sri Parikkal Bagwathi Temple Puliyannur and Thandilum Mosque.

== Places of interest ==
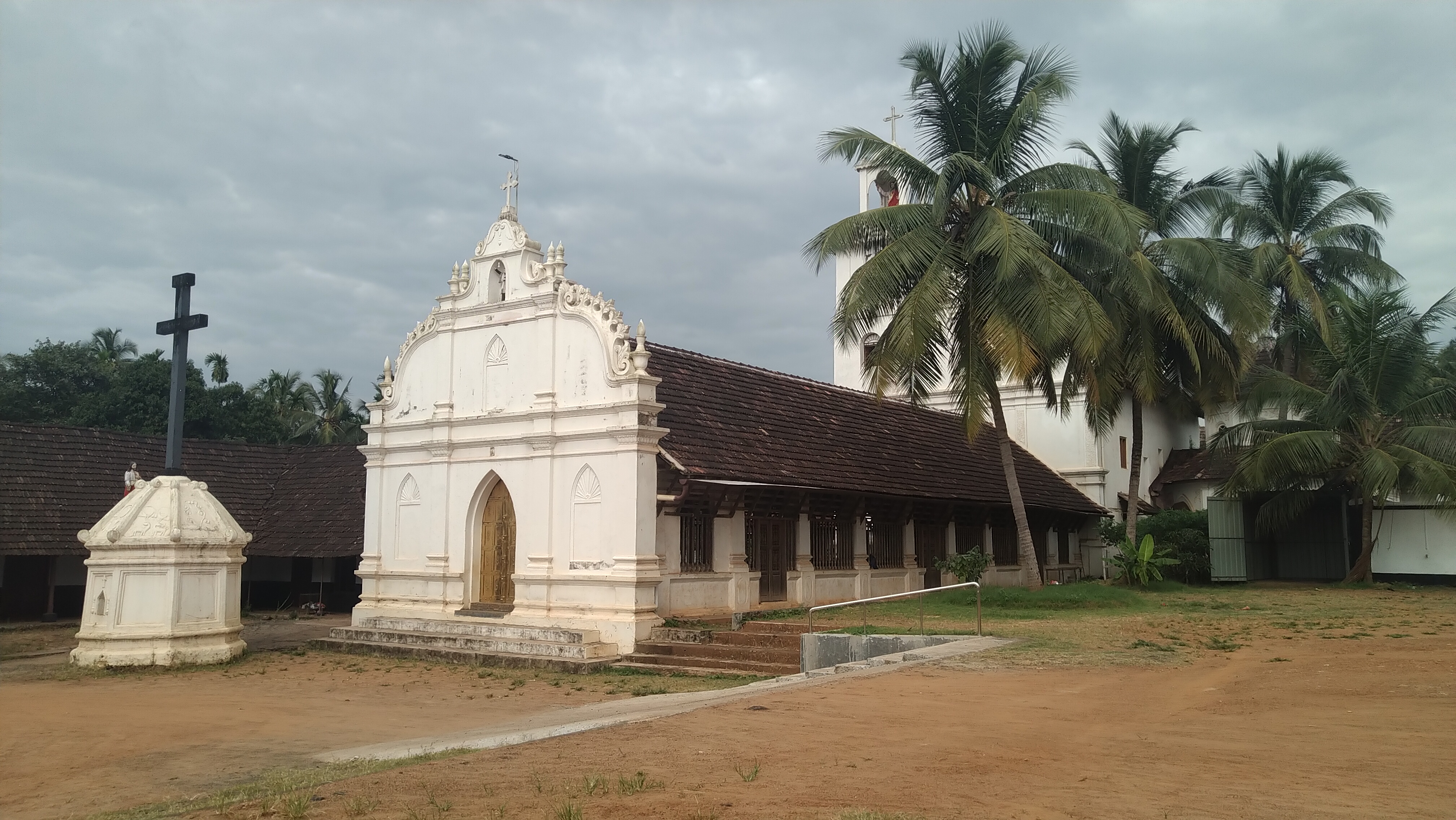
Arnos Church, Velur

- St. Francis Xavier Forane Church (Protected Monument)
- Arnos Padiri Building
- Manimalarkavu Temple
- Cheramankadu ayyapan temple
- Kodasheri Mala
- Peruvan Mala
- Cheernthala Sheva Temple
- Karthyane Temple
- Thayyur Kotta
- Kurumal Bhagavathi temple
- Kurumal Sreerama swami temple

== Government offices ==
- Velur co-operative society (near Velur church (main), Velur Chungam, Kiralur, old post office)
- Velur-chungam - Primary Health Centre
- Health Centre at Velur panjayath Building, near post office (homeopathic and ayurvedhic treatments )
- BSNL Office at Post Office Centre, Velur
- KSEB Office at Old Post Office Centre, Velur
- Village Office Near Post Office Centre, Velur
- Milk Society, Thayyur Road, Near Post Office Centre, Velur

== Other institutions ==
- Govt. R S R V H S S Velur
- St. Xavier’s U P School, St. Francis Xavier’s Nursery School
- PMLP School Kiraloor
- Sal Sabeel LP School (CBSE), Kurumal (Kiraloor)
- Sri Vigneswra CBSE School, Kiraloor Road, Velur Chungam
- RMLP School, Velur West
- FATRI – Family apostolate training & research institute.
- Lisieux College, Naduvilangadi
- Sanjo Bhavan of sisters of St. Joseph the worker, Velur Bazar
- St. Thomas UPS Puliannur
- Govt.HS School, Thayyur

The village has some important government offices - like the Village office, post office, KSEB Section Office, South Indian Bank, Velur Service Co operative Bank (3 Branches), Krishi Bhavan, Telephone Exchange (BSNL) etc. The village is covered under all cellular / mobile operators (GSM and CDMA) and 4G Coverage by Reliance Jio Infocomm Limited in Kerala circle.

== Notable people from Velur ==
- Pushpavathy Poypadathu, singer

== See also ==
- Roads in Kerala
- List of state highways in Kerala
