= Christian poetry =

Genre of poetry

Christian poetry is any poetry that contains Christian teachings, themes, or references. The influence of Christianity on poetry has been great in any area that Christianity has taken hold. Christian poems often directly reference the Bible, while others provide allegory.

== Early history ==
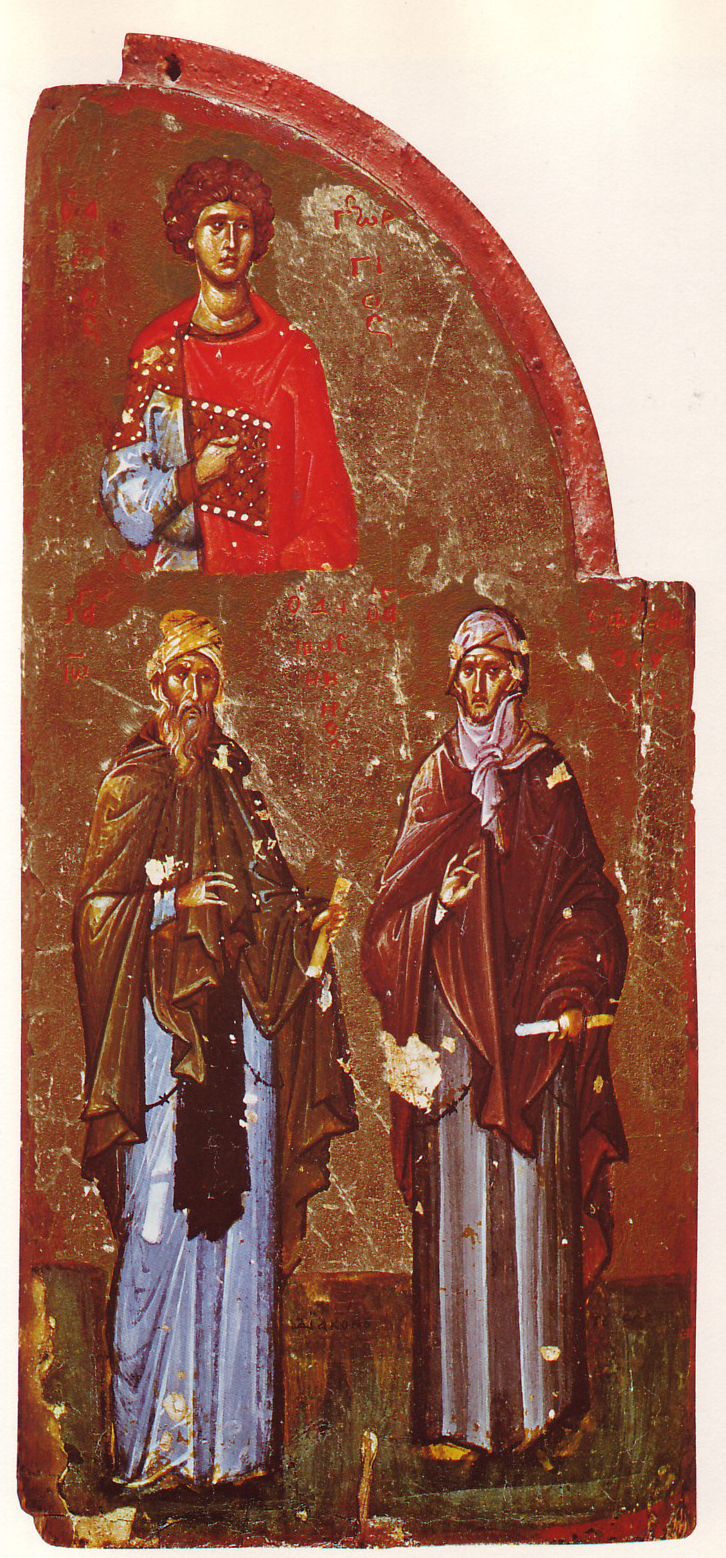
Saints Ephrem the Syrian (right) George (top) and John Damascene on a 14th-century triptych.

Poetic forms have been used by Christians since the recorded history of the faith begins. The earliest Christian poetry, in fact, appears in the New Testament. Canticles such as the Magnificat and Nunc Dimittis, which appear in the Gospel of Luke, take the Biblical poetry of the psalms of the Hebrew Bible as their models. Many Biblical scholars also believe that St Paul of Tarsus quotes bits of early Christian hymns in his epistles. Passages such as Philippians 2:5-11 (following) are thought by many Biblical scholars to represent early Christian hymns that were being quoted by the Apostle:

Let this mind be in you, which was also in Christ Jesus:
Who, being in the form of God, thought it not robbery to be equal with God:
But made himself of no reputation, and took upon him the form of a servant, and was made in the likeness of men:
And being found in fashion as a man, he humbled himself, and became obedient unto death, even the death of the cross.
Wherefore God also hath highly exalted him, and given him a name which is above every name:
That at the name of Jesus every knee should bow, of things in heaven, and things in earth, and things under the earth;
And that every tongue should confess that Jesus Christ is Lord, to the glory of God the Father. (KJV)

A fuller appreciation of the formal literary virtues of Biblical poetry remained unavailable for European Christians until 1754, when Robert Lowth (later made a bishop in the Church of England), kinder to the Hebrew language than his own, published Praelectiones Academicae de Sacra Poesi Hebraeorum, which identified parallelism as the chief rhetorical device within Hebrew poetry.

In the Syriac language, the 4th-century poet and Deacon St. Ephrem the Syrian, in addition to being a Christian poet comparable to Dante Alighieri, is also credited as the founder of the School of Nisibis, which, in later centuries, became the main centre of learning of the Syriac Christian tradition. He is revered as a great poet and theologian by all traditional Christian church denominations and was declared a Doctor of the Church in the Roman Catholic Church by Pope Benedict XV in 1920.

Within the world of classical antiquity, Christian poets often struggled with their relationship to the existing traditions of Greek and Latin poetry, which were of course heavily influenced by paganism. Paul quotes the pagan poets Aratus and Epimenides in Acts 17:28: "For in him we live, and move, and have our being: as certain also of your own poets have said, 'For we are also his offspring.'" Some early Christian poets such as Ausonius continued to include allusions to pagan deities and standard classical figures and allusions continued to appear in his verse. Other Christian poems of the Late Roman Empire, such as the Psychomachia of Prudentius, cut back on allusions to Greek mythology, but continue the use of inherited classical forms.

Other early Christian poets were more innovative. The hymnodist Venantius Fortunatus wrote a number of important poems that are still used in the liturgy of the Roman Catholic Church, such as the Vexilla Regis ("The Royal Standard") and Pange, lingua, gloriosi proelium certaminis ("Sing, O my tongue, of the glorious struggle"). From a literary and linguistic viewpoint, these hymns represent important innovations; they turn away from Greek prosody and instead seem to have been based on the rhythmic marching songs of the Roman legions.

A related issue concerned the literary quality of Christian scripture. Most of the New Testament was written (or translated from Semitic languages) in a sub-literary variety of koinê Greek, as was the Septuagint, the Pre-Christian translation of the Old Testament into Greek. The Old Latin Bible added further solecisms to those found in its source texts.

None of the Christian scriptures were written to suit the tastes of those who were educated in classical Greek or Latin rhetoric. Educated pagans, seeing the sub-literary quality of the Christian scriptures, posed a problem for Christian apologists: why did the Holy Ghost write so badly? Some Christian writers flatly rejected classical standards of rhetoric, such as Tertullian, who famously asked, "What has Athens to do with Jerusalem?"

The cultural prestige of classical literary languages was not so easy for other Christians to overcome. St. Jerome, trained in the classical Latin rhetoric of Cicero, observed that dismay over the quality of existing Latin Bible translations was a major motivating factor that induced Pope Damasus I to order him to translate the Vulgate, which went on to become the standard Latin Bible, and was used by the Roman Catholic Church in the Tridentine Mass until the Second Vatican Council. In the Anglosphere, vernacular translations of the Christian Bible approved for the reading of the Pre-Vatican II Roman Catholic laity were the Douay-Rheims and the mid-20th-century translation by Monsignor Ronald Knox.

In many European vernacular literatures, Christian poetry appears among the earliest monuments of those literatures, and Biblical imitations and paraphrases often preceded Bible translations. Much Old Irish poetry was both composed and collected by Irish monks, such as Dallán Forgaill, Óengus of Tallaght, and Beccán mac Luigdech, and is on religious themes.

Even during the 20th-century, after hearing Sean-nós singer Joe Heaney’s first public performance in Dublin of a famous work of oral poetry in the Irish language about the Crucifixion of Jesus and the grief of His Blessed Mother from the Connemara oral tradition, Máirtín Ó Cadhain, a highly important figure to Modern literature in Irish, wrote, "In Caoineadh na dtrí Muire he brings home to us the joys and sorrows of Mary with the intimacy and poignancy of a Fra Angelico painting."

By introducing the rules of Old Irish vernacular prosody into Ecclesiastical Latin, Irish monks, including St Columba, Columbanus, Coelius Sedulius, Adamnan, Virgilius Maro Grammaticus, and John Scotus Eriugena, produced many immortal works of religious poetry in a new dialect now termed Hiberno-Latin. This story is repeated in most European languages.

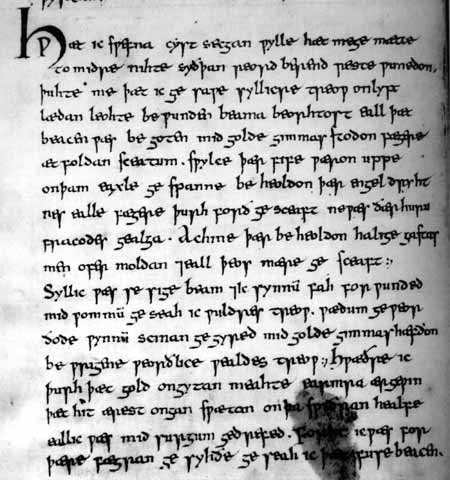
The medieval manuscript of The Dream of the Rood from the Vercelli book.

In Old English poetry, the Dream of the Rood, an iconic work of dream vision poetry on Christ's crucifixion which adapts the conventions of Pagan Germanic epic poetry and applies them to Jesus, is one of the earliest extant monuments of Anglo-Saxon literature. The Old Saxon Heliand similarly dates from the Christian mission to and the conversion of the Germanosphere, but is much longer and also takes in the whole of Jesus' life and ministry.

In Armenian literature, by far the most important Christian poet is St. Gregory of Narek, who was a priest and monk at Narek Monastery near Lake Van during the 10th century. Other highly important Armenian Christian poets include Nerses Shnorhali and Grigor Magistros.

The Tale of Igor's Campaign (Слово о пълкѹ Игоревѣ), an epic poem in Old East Slavic, describes a failed raid made in the year 1185 by a Christian army led by Prince Igor Svyatoslavich of Novhorod-Siverskyi, in the Chernihiv Oblast of modern Ukraine, against the Polovtsians (Cumans), Pagan Turkic nomads living along the southern banks of the Don River. Since its 18th-century rediscovery in a 15th-century monastic manuscript from Yaroslavl and 1800 publication by Aleksei Musin-Pushkin, The Lay, which is often compared with both The Song of Roland and the Finnish Kalevala, has inspired many other poems, art, and, in Classical music, the opera Prince Igor by Mighty Handful composer Alexander Borodin. It is claimed by Russians, Belarusians, and Ukrainians as a national epic, and has accordingly wielded an enormous influence upon the literature and culture in all three nations. Particularly due to its publication having influenced both Taras Shevchenko, the national poet of Ukraine, and Alexander Pushkin, his counterpart during the simultaneous Golden Age of Russian Poetry. In the Anglosphere, even though its other translators have included Vladimir Nabokov, the literary translation most faithful to both the meaning and poetic form of the original, was produced in a collaboration between Canadian university professors Watson Kirkconnell and C.H. Andrusyshen.

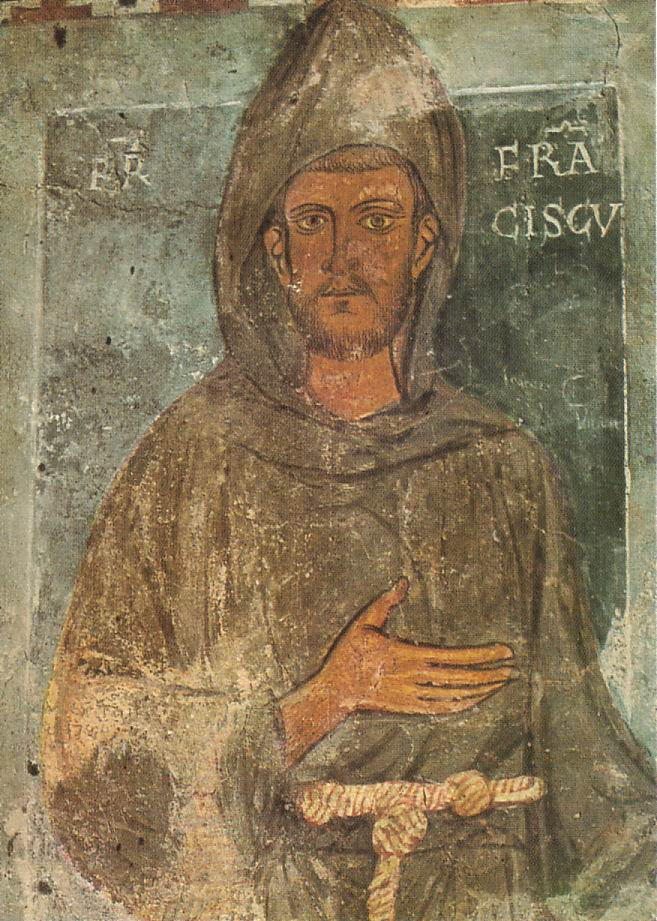
The oldest surviving depiction of St. Francis is a fresco near the entrance of the Benedictine abbey of Subiaco, painted between March 1228 and March 1229.

The Canticle of the Sun was composed by Saint Francis of Assisi in the Umbrian dialect of the Italian language, but has since been translated into many languages. It is believed to be among the first works of literature, if not the first, written in the Italian language rather than in Latin.

Dante Alighieri's The Divine Comedy represents one of the earliest examples of Italian poetry in the Italian language.

== The Renaissance ==
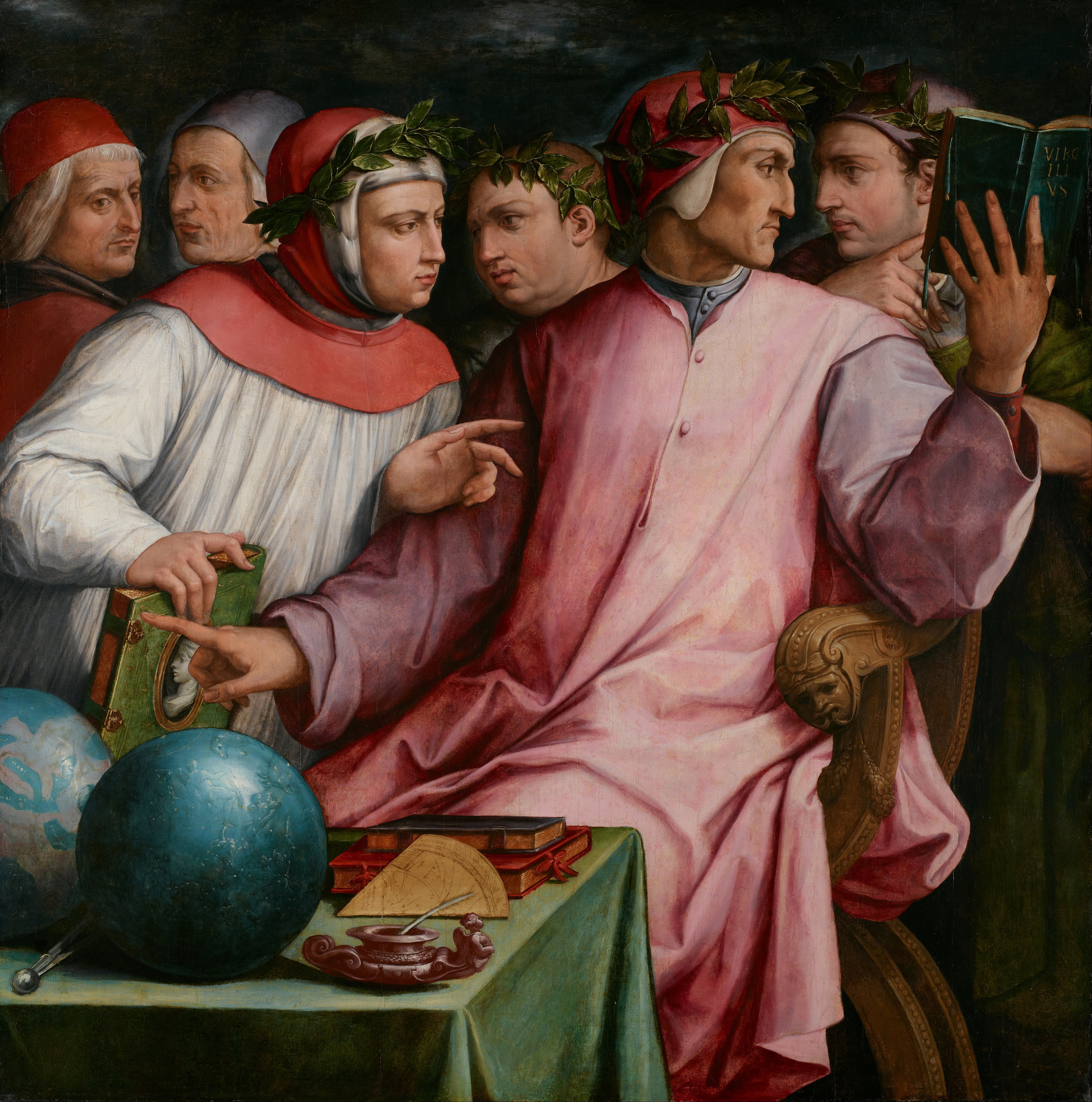
Medieval and Renaissance Italian writers portrayed by Giorgio Vasari in Six Tuscan Poets (1544). From left to right: Cristoforo Landino, Marsilio Ficino, Francesco Petrarca, Giovanni Boccaccio, Dante Alighieri, and Guido Cavalcanti.

The Council of Florence in 1439 led to temporary reunion between the Roman Catholic and Greek Orthodox Churches. The Fall of Constantinople in 1453, however, sent many Greek people fleeing to Western Europe as refugees and bringing Ancient Greek books and manuscripts with them that Western Christians had been previously unable to access. As this was during the Gutenberg Revolution, these books were mass-produced and gave impetus to the Renaissance, but also caused many intellectuals, writers, and poets to embrace a nostalgia for Classical mythology and an antipathy for Christianity.

At the same time, however, many European poets adapted the conventions of Ancient Greek and Roman epic poetry to retelling of stories from the Christian Bible. The usual practice in Renaissance humanist poetry was to choose the New Testament for a source. Another highly popular alternative was verse dramas which revived Aristotle's three Classical unities, as is particularly seen in Spanish Golden Age theatre.

In 1535, Marco Girolamo Vida, a Bishop of the Catholic Church in Italy and Renaissance Humanist, published the Christiad, an epic poem in six cantos about the life and mission of Jesus Christ, which is modeled upon the poetry of Virgil and was written at the request of Pope Leo X. According to Watson Kirkconnell, the Christiad, "was one of the most famous poems of the Early Renaissance". Furthermore, according to Kirkconnell, Vida's, "description of the Council in Hell, addressed by Lucifer, in Book I", was, "a feature later to be copied", by Torquato Tasso, Abraham Cowley, and by John Milton in Paradise Lost. The standard English translations, which render Vida's poem into heroic couplets, were published by John Cranwell in 1768 and by Edward Granan in 1771.

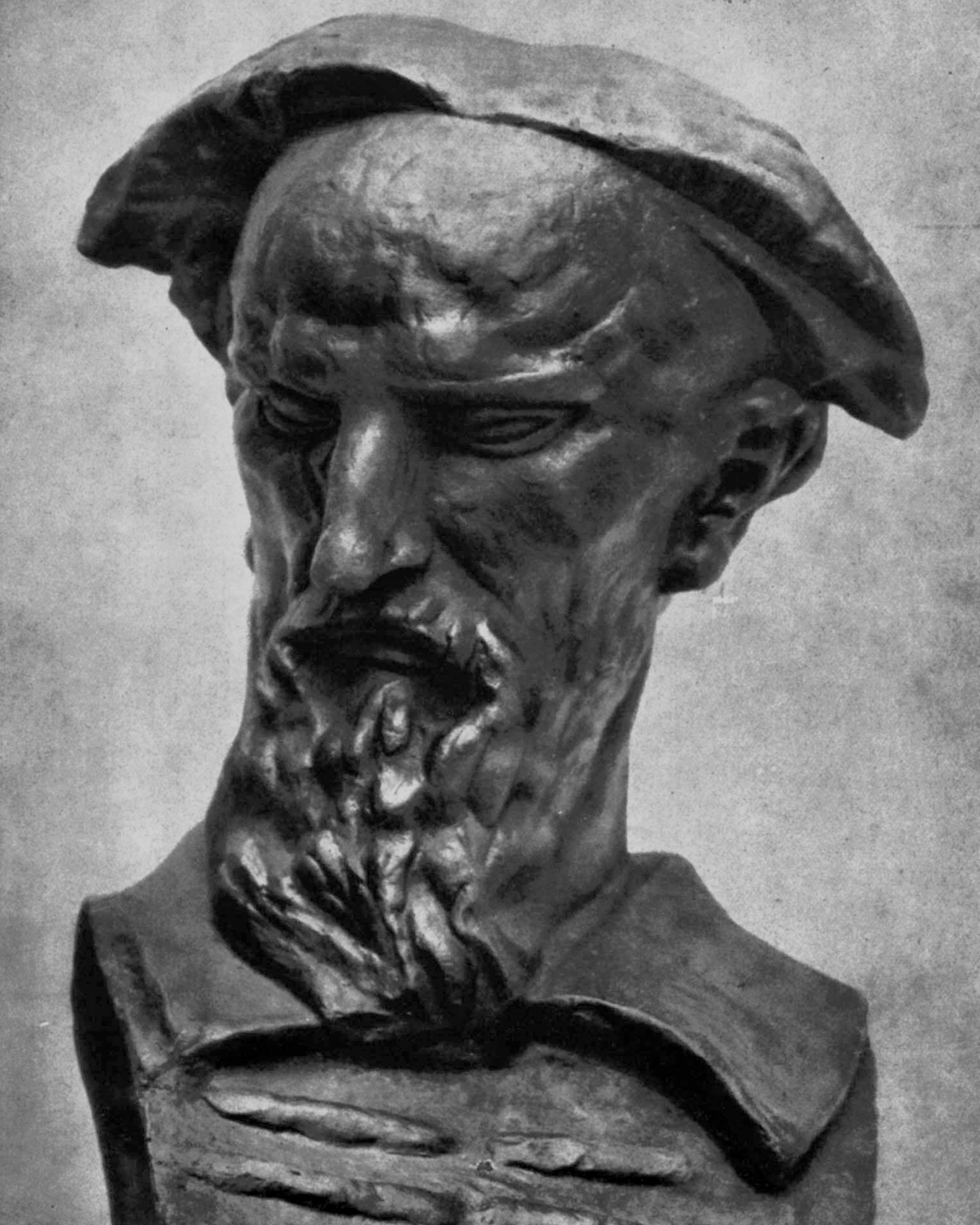
Bust of Marko Marulić by Ivan Meštrović in Split.

Marko Marulić, a Croatian lawyer and Renaissance Humanist, defied the usual practice of Christian epic poetry at the time by choosing to retell stories from the Old Testament instead of the New. In 1517, Marulic finished writing the Davidiad an epic poem in Virgilian Latin in 14 books, which retells the life of King David, whom Marulić depicts, in keeping with Catholic doctrine, as a prototype for Jesus Christ. Unfortunately, the Davidiad was long considered to be lost. A manuscript was re-discovered only in 1924, only to be lost again and re-discovered in 1952.

In addition to the small portions that attempt to recall the epics of Homer, The Davidiad is heavily modeled upon Virgil's Aeneid. This is so much the case that Marulić's contemporaries called him the "Christian Virgil from Split." The late Serbian-American philologist Miroslav Marcovich also detected, "the influence of Ovid, Lucan, and Statius" in the work, with is replete with learned allusions to Greek and Roman mythology. This was because, according to his translator Edward Mulholland, in a very common viewpoint for the time, "For Marulic, as Elisabeth von Erdmann points out, pagan myth and poetry gained a certain legitimacy when employed in the service of theology."

Similarly to both Catholic and Protestant humanists of the same era, Marulić used The Davidiad to preach a multilayered interpretation of the Old Testament, as pre-figuring the foundation of Christianity through the later events described in the New Testament. For example, Marulić compared David to Jesus Christ, King Saul to Caiaphas, the Pharisees, and the Sanhedrin, while comparing Goliath to the Devil. Marulić also used his description of David and his warriors eating the Bread of the Presence while fleeing from King Saul an opportunity to praise the Catholic doctrine of the Real Presence in the Blessed Sacrament. Furthermore, Marulić's study of the Hebrew language was just as often on display in the Davidiad; as, despite the difficulties he routinely faced in fitting Hebrew words into the rhythm of Latin dactylic hexameter, he regularly made humorous comments about how very well the etymology of Hebrew personal names fit the character or appearance of their bearers.

Marulić also wrote the epic poem Judita, which retells the events of the Book of Judith. The poem contains 2126 dodecasyllabic lines, with caesurae after the sixth syllable, composed in six books (libars). The linguistic basis of the book is Split Čakavian speech and the Štokavian lexis, and the Glagolitic original of the legend; the work thus foreshadows the unity of Croatian language.

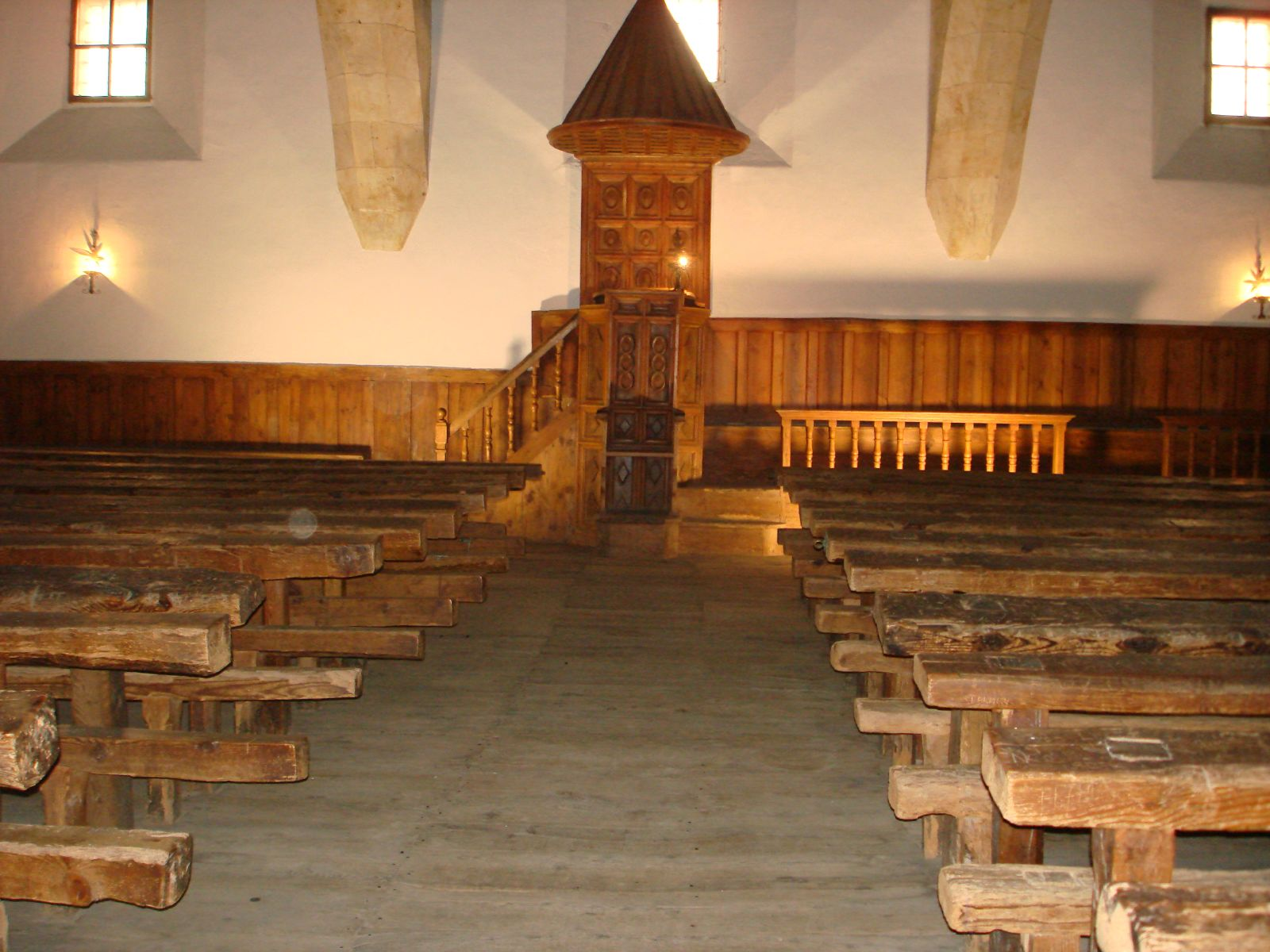
Hall of Fray Luis de León in the old building of the Universidad de Salamanca.

Meanwhile, while serving as professor of Biblical scholarship at the University of Salamanca, the Augustinian friar Luis de León also wrote many immortal works of poetry in Spanish Renaissance literature and translated Biblical Hebrew poetry into the Spanish language. Despite being a devout and believing Roman Catholic priest, Fray Luis was descended from a family of Spanish Jewish Conversos and this, as well as his vocal advocacy for teaching the Hebrew language in Catholic universities and seminaries, drew false accusations from the Dominican Order of the heresies of being both a Marrano and a Judaiser. Fray Luis was accordingly imprisoned for four years by the Spanish Inquisition before he was ruled to be completely innocent of any wrongdoing and released without charge. While the conditions of his imprisonment were never harsh and he was allowed complete access to books, according to legend, Fray Luis started his first post-Inquisition University of Salamanca lecture with the words, "As I was saying the other day..."

According to Edith Grossman, "Fray Luis is generally considered the leading poet in the far-reaching Christianization of the Renaissance in Spain during the sixteenth-century. This means that as a consequence of the Counter-Reformation, and especially of the judgments and rulings of the Council of Trent, the secular Italianate forms and themes brought into Spain by Garcilasco were used by subsequent writers to explore moral, spiritual, and religious topics. The poets and humanists who were the followers of Fray Luis in the sixteenth-century formed the influential School of Salamanca."

Many works of religious poetry by English Renaissance humanists, including Thomas More, Henry Parker, Lord Morley, and Henry Howard, Earl of Surrey, have since been edited for publication by Louise Imogen Guiney in Recusant Poets.

== Reformation and the Baroque era ==
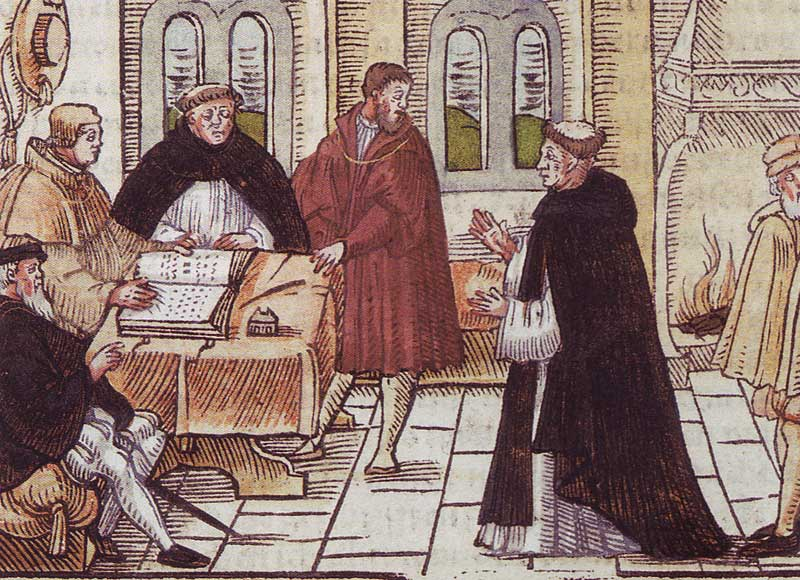
Martin Luther (right) meeting Cardinal Cajetan (left)

The ideas of both the German Reformation and Counter-Reformation stimulated hymn and religious poetry writing among both Catholics and Protestants, e.g. the Lutheran hymns of Martin Luther, Catharina Regina von Greiffenberg, and Paul Gerhardt (oft used in the chorales of Johann Sebastian Bach), the Calvinist hymns of Gerhard Tersteegen, and the Catholic hymns of Angelus Silesius, Johann Georg Seidenbusch, and Friedrich Spee.

During the French Wars of Religion, both Catholic and Huguenot poets argued their causes in verse. Of these, English poet Keith Bosley has called Huguenot soldier-poet Agrippa d'Aubigné, "the epic poet of the Protestant cause," during the French Wars of Religion. Bosley added, however, that after d'Aubigné's death, he, "was forgotten until the Romantics rediscovered him."

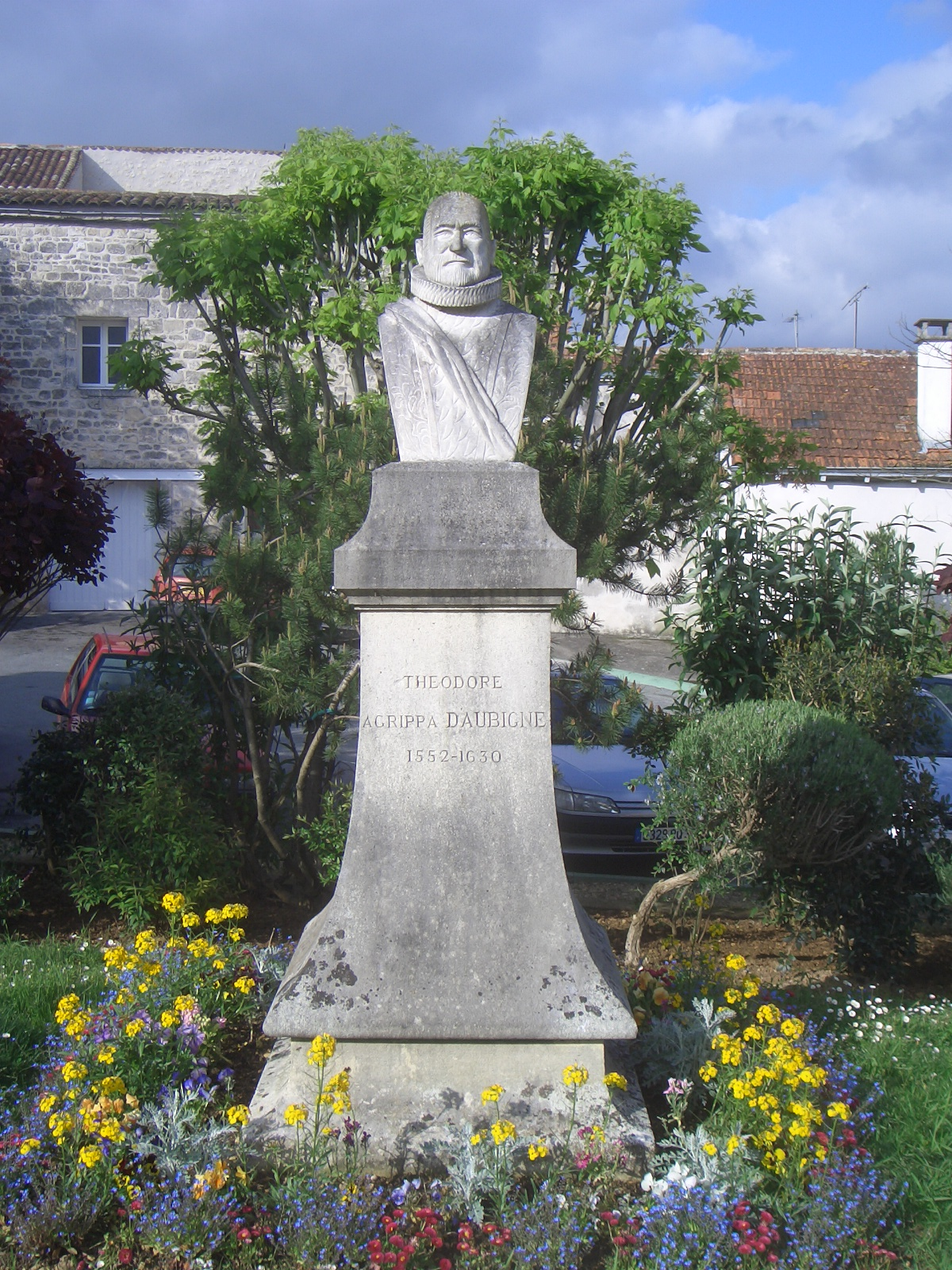
Bust of Théodore Agrippa d'Aubigné in Pons

In France in 1573, the Huguenot courtier and poet Guillaume de Salluste Du Bartas published the epic poem l'Uranie ou Muse Celèste, which praises Urania, not as the Muse of Astronomy, as was common practice during the Renaissance, but as the inspirer of sacred poetry and as the revealer of the mysteries of Heaven. According to Watson Kirkconnell, "The chief formative influences on his poetry were Homer, Virgil, Ariosto, and Ronsard. His reputation was less at home than it was abroad, where he was regarded, especially among Protestants, as one of the great geniuses of poetry". Bartas' influence upon John Milton, "was very extensive."

In 1587, Du Bartas published La Sepmaine ou Création a 7,500 line poem about the creation of the world and the Fall of Man. Despite drawing "his form from Homer, Virgil, and Ariosto", Du Bartas drew his subject-matter chiefly from George of Pisidia, St. Ambrose, and, most of all, from St. Basil the Great. The main English translation, which helped inspire Milton's Paradise Lost, is by Joshua Sylvester.

Also during the French Wars of Religion, the Catholic poet Jean de La Ceppède began using the sonnet, the favored poetic form of the Renaissance for expressing romantic love, to relate the Passion and Resurrection of Jesus Christ and for using the gods and demigods of Greek and Roman mythology, similarly to The Inklings, to point out the greatness of Jesus.

When the first volume of his sonnet sequence Theorems upon the Sacred Mystery of Our Redemption was published in 1613, La Ceppède sent a copy to Saint Francis de Sales, who had been a highly successful Catholic missionary among the Huguenots of the Chablais and who was then the Roman Catholic Bishop of overwhelmingly Calvinist Geneva. In response to La Ceppède's frequent comparisons of Jesus Christ to figures from Greek and Roman mythology, the Bishop wrote, "[I am] drawn by that learned piety which so happily makes you transform the Pagan Muses into Christian ones."

When the second volume of the Theorems appeared in 1622, La Ceppède dedicated it to King Louis XIII, in celebration of both the King's recent coming of age and his military victory against an uprising of the Huguenots of Languedoc, which had been led by Henri, Duke of Rohan.

According to Christopher Blum, "The Theorems is not only poetry, it is a splendid work of erudition, as each sonnet is provided with a commentary linking it to Scriptural and Patristic sources and, especially, to the Summa Theologiae of St. Thomas Aquinas. The work bears the mark of the Renaissance: the sonnet, that choice mode of expressing romantic love, is here purged and elevated and put in the service of the epic tale of God’s love for man. As La Ceppède put it in his introduction—which can be read in Keith Bosley’s admirable translation of seventy of the sonnets—the harlot Lady Poetry had been unstitched of 'her worldly habits' and shorn of her 'idolatrous, lying and lascivious hair' by the 'two-edged razor of profound meditation on the Passion and death of our Saviour.'"

In 1624, the year following Jean de La Ceppède's death, Cardinal de Richelieu became King Louis XIII's Minister of State and, largely through the influence of François de Malherbe, Baroque poetry was replaced by Neo-Classicism. To this day, the French poetry of the Renaissance in France is often looked down on and Nicolas Boileau-Despréaux's maxim, Enfin Malherbe vint ("Finally Malherbe arrived"), continues to be taken for granted. La Ceppède's verses and those of other religious poets from the same era, were accordingly consigned to oblivion until 1915, when they were unearthed by Fr. Henri Bremond and appeared in the first volume of his book Histoire littéraire du Sentiment religieux en France. Since then, La Ceppède's poetry has experienced a revival. It has appeared in multiple poetry anthologies and several scholarly works have been written about its author.

Meanwhile, a temporary effect of the English Reformation was a shift in English poetry toward secular subjects, which caused poetry to be condemned by members of the ultra-Protestant Puritan Movement.

In response to both Puritan attacks on verse and the secular subjects that inspired most English poetry at the time, Robert Southwell, a Roman Catholic priest and clandestine Jesuit missionary in Elizabethan England, wrote a collection of poems on religious subjects. In his poems, Southwell drew heavily upon the Spiritual Exercises of St. Ignatius Loyola and on the new Catholic art-works he had seen while studying for the priesthood at the English College in Rome. As the strict censorship in England made it impossible for him to legally publish his poems, Southwell circulated them clandestinely, in a 16th century version of the samizdat literature that followed the Bolshevik Revolution.

In a forward to his poems, which many scholars believe was addressed to Southwell's cousin, William Shakespeare, the priest-poet wrote, "Poets by abusing their talent, and making the follies and feignings of love the customary subject of their base endeavors, have so discredited this faculty that a poet, a lover, and a liar, are by many reckoned but three words of one signification. But the vanity of men cannot counterpease the authority of God, Who delivering many parts of the scripture in verse, and by His Apostle willing us to exercise our devotion in hymns and spiritual sonnets warranteth the art to be good and the use allowable. And therefore not only among the heathens, whose gods were chiefly canonized by their poets, and their Pagan divinity oracled in verse, but even in the Old and New Testament, it hath been used by men of the greatest piety in matters of most devotion. Christ Himself, by making a hymn the conclusion of His Last Supper and the prologue to the first pageant of His Passion gave His Spouse a method to imitate, as in the office of the Church it appeareth and all men a pattern to know this measured and footed style. But the Devil, as he affecteth deity and seeketh to have all the compliments of Divine honor applied to his service, so hath he among the rest possessed also most poets with his idle fancies. For in lieu of solemn and devout matter, to which in duty they owe their abilities, they now busy themselves in expressing such passions as only serve for testimonies to how unworthy affections they have wedded their Wiles. And because the best the best course to let them see the error of their works is to weave a new web in their own loom; I have here laid a few coarse threads together to invite some skillfuller wits to go forward in the same or to begin some finer piece wherein it may be seen, how well verse and virtue suit together. Blame me not, (good cousin) though I send you a blameworthy present, in which the most that can commend it, is the good will of the writer, neither art not invention giving it any credit. If in me this be a fault, you cannot be dauntless that did importune me to commit it, and therefore you must bear part of the penance, when it shall please sharp censures to impose. In the meantime with many good wishes I send you these few ditties add you the tunes and let the mean I pray be still a part in all your music."

Even though Southwell was captured, tortured, convicted of high treason and executed at Tyburn in 1595, the underground priest-poet's illegal poetry helped inspire the Metaphysical poets, such as William Alabaster, John Donne, Richard Crashaw, and George Herbert, to write Christian religious poetry as well.

More recently, the posthumous 1873 publication of Southwell's translation into Elizabethan English of Fray Diego de Estella's Meditaciónes devotíssimas del amor de Dios ("A Hundred Meditations on the Love of God") helped inspire Fr. Gerard Manley Hopkins to write the poem The Windhover.

During the Reformation in Wales, Queen Elizabeth I of England commanded that Welsh poets be examined and licensed by officials of the Crown, who had alleged that those whom they considered genuine Bards were, "much discouraged to travail in the exercise and practice of their knowledge and also not a little hindered in their living and preferments." Unlicensed Bards, according to Hywel Teifi Edwards, "would be put to some honest work." Although Edwards has compared the unlicensed Bards of the era with, "today's abusers of the Social Security system," historian Philip Caraman quotes a 1575 "Report on Wales" that reveals an additional reason for the decree. During the Queen's ongoing religious persecution of the Catholic Church in England and Wales, many Welsh poets were, according to the report, acting as the secret emissaries of Recusants in the Welsh nobility and were helping those nobles spread the news about secret Catholic Masses and religious pilgrimages.

This was no idle claim. When unlicensed bard Richard Gwyn was put on trial for high treason before a panel headed by the Chief Justice of Chester, Sir George Bromley, at Wrexham in 1523, Gwyn stood accused not only of refusing to take the Oath of Supremacy and of involvement in the local Catholic underground, but also of reciting, "certain rhymes of his own making against married priests and ministers." Gwyn was found guilty and condemned to death by hanging, drawing and quartering. The sentence was carried out in the Beast Market in Wrexham on 15 October 1584. Richard Gwyn was canonised by Pope Paul VI in 1970 as one of the Forty Martyrs of England and Wales. His feast day is celebrated on 17 October. Six works of Welsh poetry by Richard Gwyn, five carols and a funeral ode, have been discovered and published. Very similar Welsh poetry was composed by Recusant Bards of the era such as Robert Gwin, Catrin ferch Gruffudd ap Hywel, and Gruffydd Robert.

In Hapsburg Spain, which was experiencing what is still called the Spanish Golden Age, poets such as Sts. Teresa of Avila and John of the Cross composed verse that remains an immortal part of the canon of Spanish poetry.

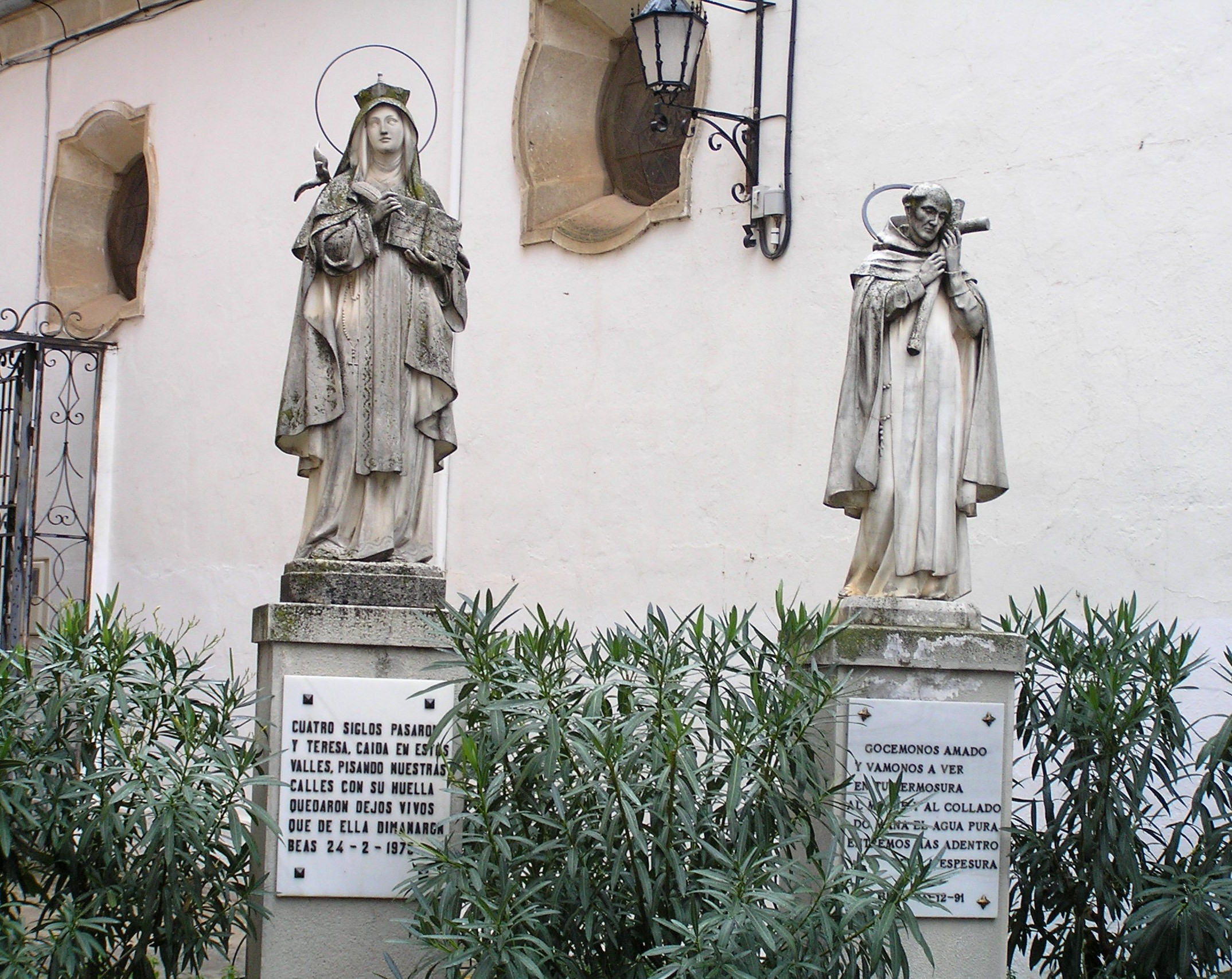
Statues representing John of the Cross and Teresa of Ávila in Beas de Segura

By far the greatest Christian poetry composed during the Spanish Golden Age was by Pedro Calderón de la Barca, a member of the minor Spanish nobility, who first served as soldier and a knight of the military and religious Order of Santiago and later became a Roman Catholic priest.

Through his many verse dramas, Calderón has had a great influence in later centuries upon Symbolism, for example by making a fall from a horse a metaphor for a fall into disgrace or dishonour; the use of horoscopes or prophecies at the start of the play as a way of making false predictions about the following to occur, to defend the Catholic doctrine of free will against the Calvinist doctrine of predestination, and to depict the unwritten nature of the future. In addition, Calderón realized that any play was a work of fiction, and that the structure of the baroque play was entirely artificial. He therefore, probably influenced by Cervantes, made regular use of metafictional techniques, such as making his characters joke about the clichés they are expected to slavishly follow. Some of the most common themes of his plays were heavily influenced by his Classical Christian education by the Jesuits. For example, as a reader and great admirer of Scholastic theologians Saint Thomas Aquinas and Francisco Suárez, Calderón liked to confront reason against emotion, intellect against instinct, and understanding against the will.

According to Russian Symbolist poet and dramatic theorist Vyacheslav Ivanov, "Let us take a look at drama, which in modern history has replaced the spectacles of universal and holy events as reflected in miniature and purely signifying forms on the stages of the mystery plays. We know that classical French tragedy is one of triumphs of the transformational, decisive idealistic principle. Calderón, however, is different. In him, everything is but a signification of the objective truth of Divine Providence, which governs human destiny. A pious son of the Spanish Church, he was able to combine all the daring of naive individualism with the most profound realism of the mystical contemplation of divine things."

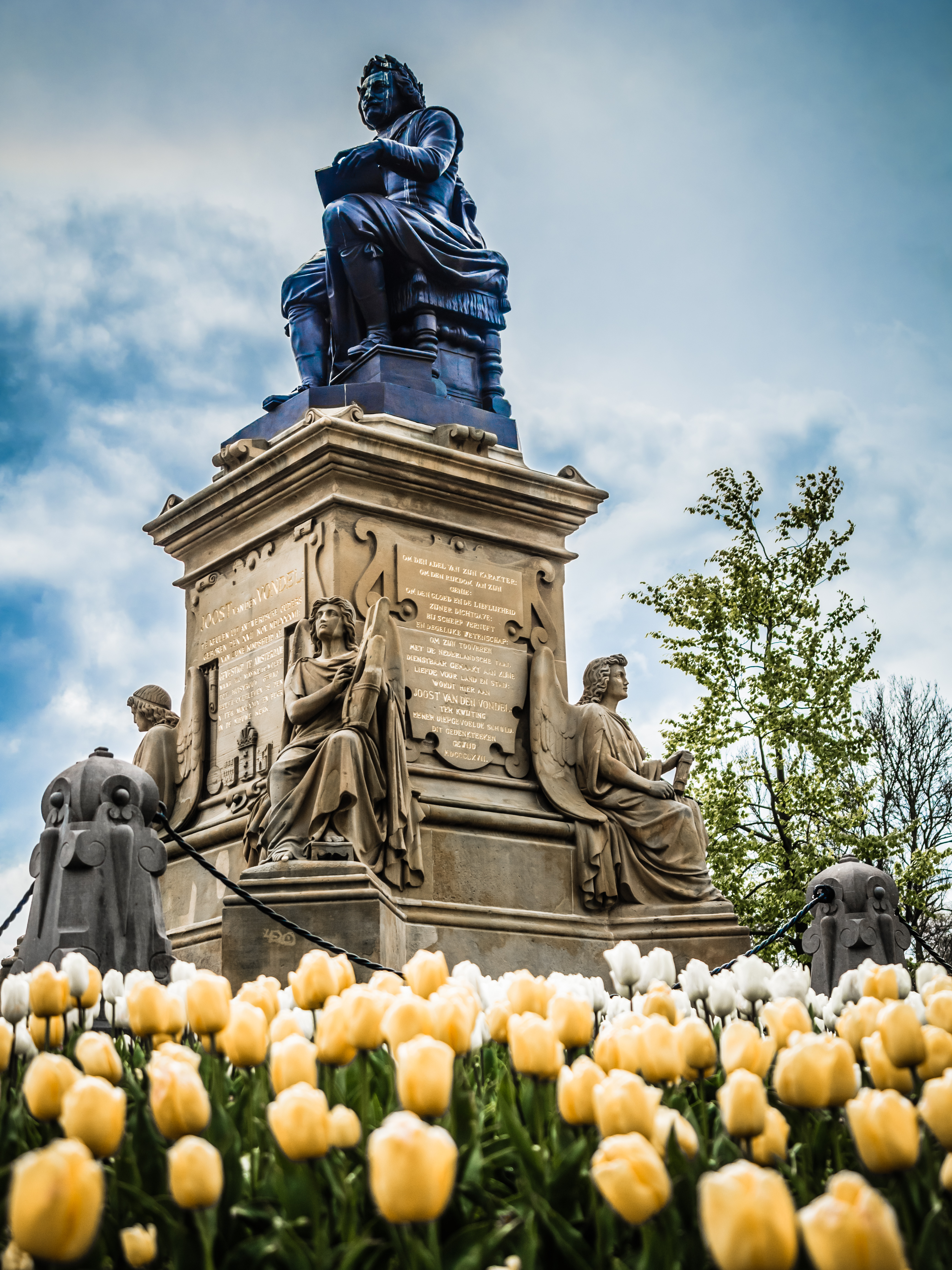
Louis Royer's statue of Vondel in the Vondelpark, typical of many created in the 19th and early 20th centuries

In Dutch poetry, the aftermath of the successful Dutch Revolt against the rule of the Spanish Netherlands by King Philip II saw both the literature of the Dutch Golden Age and the immortal work of poet and playwright Joost van den Vondel. In defiance of the very harsh censorship and religious persecution imposed upon minority faiths in the Dutch Republic by the Dutch Reformed Church following the Synod of Dort, Vondel adapted the events depicted in the Christian Bible into verse dramas, which were heavily influenced by Vondel's translations and careful study of the tragedies of Sophocles and of the theatre of Ancient Greece. Vondel is now regarded as the pinnacle of Dutch literature and has been alleged by several literary scholars to have been a major influence upon the Christian epic poetry of John Milton.

== The Age of Reason and after ==
The 18th-century witnessed both the secularization of the Age of Reason and the defense and revival of traditional religion of the Counter-Enlightenment.

In England, the Dissenting and renewal movements of the same century saw a marked increase in the number and publication of new hymns due to the activity of Protestant poets such as Isaac Watts, the father of English hymns, Philip Doddridge, Augustus Toplady, and especially John and Charles Wesley, founders of Methodism. In the 19th century hymn singing came to be accepted in the Church of England, and numerous books of hymns for that body appeared.

In 1704, when The Philippines was still the capital of the Spanish East Indies, Gaspar Aquino de Belén authored the Pasyon: a famous work of narrative poetry in the Tagalog language about the passion, death and resurrection of Jesus.

The uninterrupted recitation or Pabasa of the whole epic is a popular Filipino Catholic devotion during the Lenten season, and particularly during Holy Week.

In 2011, the performing art was cited by the National Commission for Culture and the Arts as one of the Intangible Cultural Heritage of the Philippines under the performing arts category that the government may nominate in the UNESCO Intangible Cultural Heritage Lists.

In America with the Second Great Awakening, hymn writing flourished from folk hymns and Negro spirituals to more literary texts from the likes of Oliver Wendell Holmes Sr. Women hymn writers gained prominence including Anglo-Irish hymn-writer Mrs C. F. Alexander, the author of All things bright and beautiful. Anna B. Warner wrote the poem "Jesus loves me," which, put to music, many Christian children learn to this day.

The parallel development of German Romanticism also produced Christian religious poetry by Annette von Droste-Hülshoff and Clemens Brentano, as well as the rediscovery and publication of ancient and Medieval religious poetry by linguists and antiquarians like Baron Joseph von Laßberg, Friedrich Blume, and Johann Martin Lappenberg. The same era and its aftermath also produced hymn writing by Silent Night lyricist Joseph Mohr, Cordula Wöhler, and Joseph Hermann Mohr.

During an 1893 Welsh eisteddfod held as part of the World Columbian Exposition in Chicago, Rev. Evan Reese, a Calvinistic Methodist minister from Puncheston, Pembrokeshire, and author of Welsh poetry whose Bardic name was Dyfed, won the Bardic Chair and the $500 prize money offered for a 2,000 line awdl on the set subject Iesu o Nazareth ("Jesus of Nazareth"). Rev. Reese went on to become the Archdruid of the Gorsedd Cymru and to announce the posthumous victory of Hedd Wyn at the infamous 1917 "Eisteddfod of the Black Chair."

Christian poetry figured prominently in the Western literary canon from the Antiquity through the 18th century.

However, with the progressive secularization of Western Civilization from about 1800 until the present, religious poetry is being less represented in Western academic writing.

== Modern Christian poetry ==
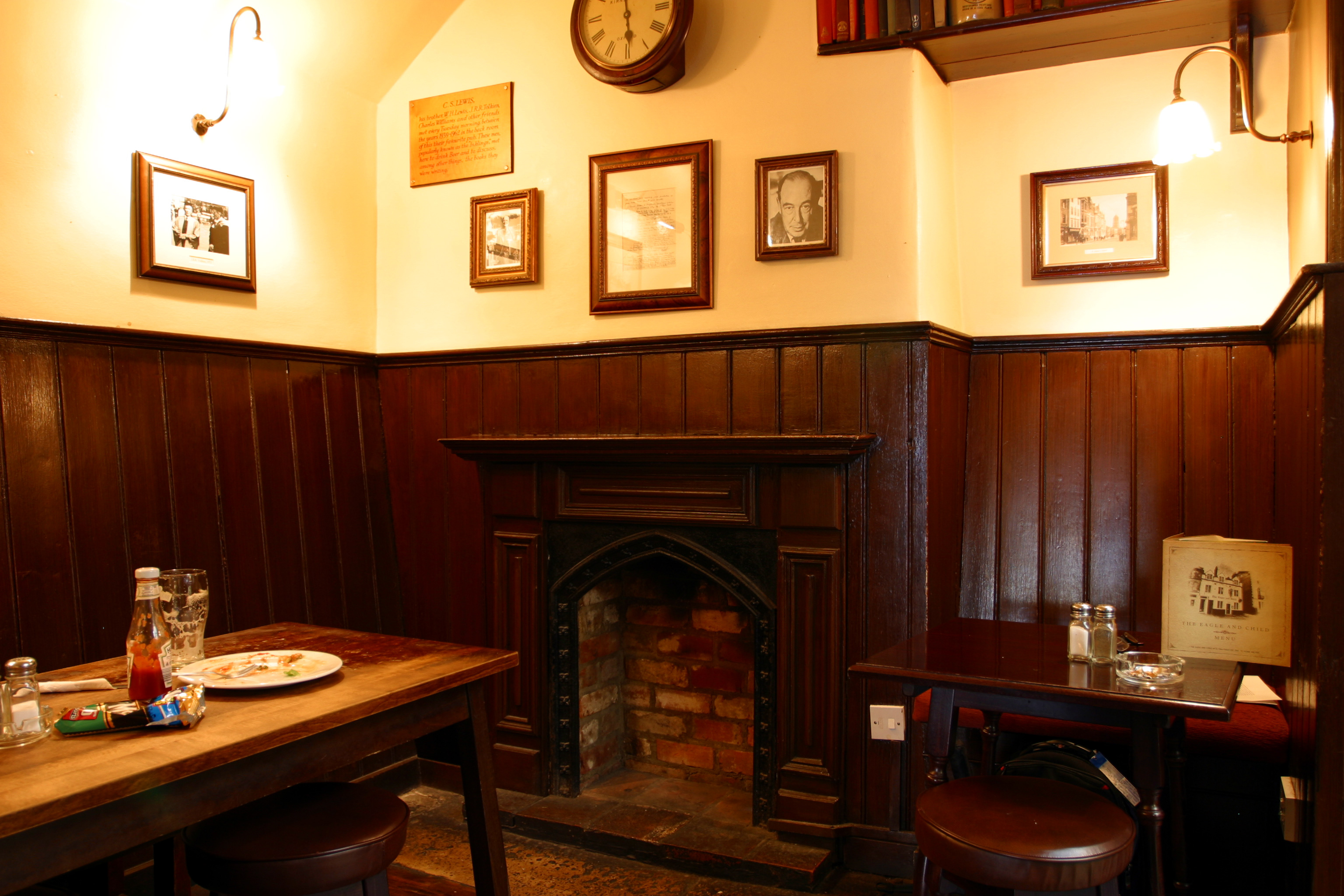
A corner of The Eagle and Child pub, formerly the landlord's sitting-room where C.S. Lewis's friends, including The Inklings, informally gathered on Tuesday mornings. There is a small display of memorabilia.

Twentieth and 21st century Christian poetry especially suffers from a difficulty of definition. The writings of a Christian poet are not necessarily classified as Christian poetry nor are writings of secular poets dealing with Christian material. The themes of poetry are necessarily hard to pin down, and what some see as a Christian theme or viewpoint may not be seen by others. A number of modern writers are widely considered to have Christian themes in much of their poetry, including G. K. Chesterton, J.R.R. Tolkien, C.S. Lewis, T. S. Eliot, and Elizabeth Jennings.

In 1976, Plakkiyil Chacko Devassia, an Eastern Rite Catholic poet in Sanskrit and Malayalam from the Syro-Malabar Church of India, published, as part of the Sanskrit revival, the Kristubhagavatam, a retelling of the life of Jesus Christ based on the Gospels, but according to the ancient traditions of the Mahakavya, a very high prestige genre of Indian epic poetry in Classical Sanskrit and with many mentions of the gods and heroes of Hinduism and even of Mohandas K. Gandhi in order, like The Inklings and Jean de La Ceppède, to point out the greatness of Jesus.

K. R. Srinivasa Iyengar wrote that "The Gospel-story is retained in essentials, but... the sonority of Sanskrit gives a fresh morning splendour and resonance to Jesus' divine ministry. Mary held Joseph's hand as Arundhati did Vasishtha's; Just as Vasudeva hid his son Krishna in Nanda's house, so did Joseph take Jesus to Egypt for his safety; Lazarus' sisters embraced him as he emerged out of his tomb, even as Devayani embraced Kacha as he revived after death.... in betraying Jesus with a kiss, wasn't Judas anticipating Godse who was to kill the Mahatma after first saluting him? The similes come naturally, and rather bring out the basic unity of texture that binds all human history."

Mar Joseph Parecattil, Archbishop of Ernakulum and a Catholic cardinal (in the Syro-Malabar Catholic Church, one of the Eastern Catholic Churches in full communion with the Roman Catholic Church), and recent President of the Catholic Bishops' Conference of India, wrote in his Appreciation that, "I have no hesitation in saying that this 'magnum opus' of prof. P. C. Devassia will certainly throw open the doors for those Sanyasins and other Sanskrit scholars, who usually do not go in for the life of Christ written in western languages, to have access to Christ in the idioms and expressions of a language with which they are familiar."

Within 20th-century Welsh poetry, Saunders Lewis' use of poetic forms included both the use of traditional strict metre forms in cynghanedd such as cywyddau and awdlau as well as the Sicilian School's sonnet form, "a variety of other rhyming stanzas", and "full breathed free verse", which were derived from poetry in other languages. Following his conversion to the Catholic Church, Lewis also wrote many works of Christian religious poetry inspired by his new faith. These included poems about the Real Presence in the Blessed Sacrament, a poem that sympathetically describes St. Joseph's crisis of faith, about the traumatic but purgatorial sense of loss experienced by St. Mary Magdalen after the Crucifixion of Jesus Christ, and about attending the Tridentine Mass on Christmas Day.

Within New Formalism, a literary movement in American poetry, there are several authors of Christian poetry. They include Dana Gioia, Frederick Turner, David Middleton, and James Matthew Wilson.

When asked by William Baer about his decision to write Christian poetry, English-American New Formalist Frederick Turner said, "In the 20th century, it became more and more frowned on to advertise your religious views. Partly it was a reaction against the 'tolerant hypocrisy' of the Victorians, but the primary reason, of course, was the intellectual fashion of the death of God. You really couldn't be a respectable thinker unless you made an act of faith that there is nothing but matter in the world. We now know, of course, from countless scientific discoveries, that matter itself has a relatively late appearance in the universe, and if the universe looks like anything, it looks like a gigantic thought, which Eddington claimed a long time ago. The best metaphor for the universe is not a gigantic machine, but rather a thought, which from a theological point of view is perfectly reasonable. But there's still a lot of pressure to conform in the arts and academia, and it also has professional ramifications. People could certainly lose their jobs for expressing themselves like Hopkins, Dickinson, or Milton – or they wouldn't get those jobs in the first place."

Modern Christian poetry may be found in anthologies and in several Christian magazines such as Commonweal, Christian Century and Sojourners. Poetry by a new generation of Catholic poets appears in St. Austin Review, Dappled Things, The Lamp, and First Things.

In a 2022 interview with St. Austin Review co-editor Joseph Pearce, Polish journalist Anna Szyda from the literary magazine Magna Polonia explained that the nihilism of modern American poetry is widely noticed and commented upon in the Third Polish Republic as reflecting, "the deleterious influence of the contemporary civilisation on the American soul." In response, StAR co-editor Joseph Pearce described "the neo-formalist revival" inspired by the late Richard Wilbur and how it has been reflected in recent verse by the Catholic poets whom he and Robert Asch publish in StAR. Pearce said that the Catholic faith and optimism of the younger generation of Catholic poets made him feel hope for the future.

== Examples of Christian poets ==
The following list is chronological by birth year.

- St. Ephrem the Syrian (ca. 306 — 373)
- St. Ausonius (310–395)
- Hilary of Poitiers (ca. 310 — 367)
- Gregory of Nazianzus (329 — 389)
- Prudentius (348–413)
- Narsai (c.399 - c.502)
- Coelius Sedulius (c.450)
- Jacob of Serugh (c.451 - 521)
- Romanos the Melodist (ca. 490 — 556)
- Venantius Fortunatus (530 - 609)
- St. Dallán Forgaill (560 - 640)
- George Pisida (fl. 7th century)
- Beccán mac Luigdech (fl. 7th century)
- St. Cædmon (657–684)
- Cosmas of Maiuma (ca. 675 — 752)
- John of Damascus (ca. 676— 749)
- Theodulf of Orléans (ca. 750— 821)
- Cynewulf (9th century)
- Theophanes the Confessor (d. ca. 850)
- Hrotsvitha of Gandersheim Abbey (c. 935–973)
- Gregory of Narek (c.950-c.1003)
- John Mauropous (ca. 1000 — 1070s?)
- Symeon the New Theologian (949 — 1022)
- Hildegard of Bingen (1098 — 1179)
- Nerses IV the Gracious (1102 - 1173)
- Francis of Assisi (1181 — 1226)
- Thomas of Celano (1185–1265)
- Clare of Assisi (1193 — 1253)
- Jacopone da Todi (ca. 1230 – 1306)
- Dante Alighieri (ca. 1265 – 1321)
- Catherine of Siena (1347 — 1380)
- Tadg Óg Ó hUiginn (c.1370 - 1448)
- Marko Marulić (1450 - 1524)
- Teresa of Avila (1515 — 1582)
- Luís de Camões (1524–1580)
- Luis de León (1527–1591)
- Richard Gwyn (1537–1584)
- John of the Cross (1542 — 1591)
- Guillaume de Salluste Du Bartas (1544–1590)
- William Davies (c. 1550 - 1593)
- Jean de La Ceppède (c. 1550 - 1623)
- Richard Verstegan (c. 1550 – c. 1640)
- Agrippa d'Aubigné (1552 - 1630)
- Jean de Sponde (1557 - 1595)
- Robert Southwell (1561 - 1595)
- Geoffrey Keating (c.1569 - c.1644)
- John Donne (1572 – 1631)
- Joost van den Vondel (1587 - 1679)
- Kadavil Chandy (c.1588 - 1673)
- Friedrich Spee (1591 - 1635)
- George Herbert (1593 — 1633)
- Pedro Calderón de la Barca (1600 - 1681)
- John Milton (1608 — 1674)
- Anne Bradstreet (1612 — 1672)
- Henrietta Catharina, Baroness von Gersdorff (1648 - 1728)
- Richard Crashaw (1613 - 1649)
- Andreas Gryphius (1616 - 1664)
- Henry Vaughan (1621 — 1695)
- Angelus Silesius (1624 — 1677)
- Gabriel Vendages de Malapeire (1624 - 1702)
- Luke Wadding (1628 - 1687)
- Fr. Wu Li, S.J. (1632 - 1718)
- Catharina Regina von Greiffenberg (1633 - 1694)
- Thomas Traherne (c.1636 — 1674)
- Gomidas Keumurdjian (c.1656 - 1707)
- Sìleas na Ceapaich (c.1660 - 1729)
- Gerhard Tersteegen (1697 - 1769)
- Donnchadh MacRath (d. c. 1700)
- Charles Wesley (1707 - 1788)
- Martha Wadsworth Brewster (1710 — c. 1757)
- Tadhg Gaelach Ó Súilleabháin (c.1715 - 1795)
- Diego José Abad (1727 - 1779)
- Thomas Christian (1754 - 1828)
- William Blake (1757 – 1827)
- Seumas MacGriogar (1759 - 1830)
- Ann Griffiths (1776 — 1805)
- Francis Xavier Pierz (1785 - 1880)
- Iain mac Ailein (1787 - 1848)
- Frederic Baraga (1797 - 1868)
- Annette von Droste-Hülshoff (1797 - 1848)
- Peter Kharischirashvili (c. 1818 - 1890)
- John Greenleaf Whittier (1807 – 1892)
- Emily Brontë (1818 — 1848)
- Anna Warner (1827 - 1915)
- Christina Rossetti (1830 — 1894)
- Neddy Beg Hom Ruy (1831–1908)
- Ilia Chavchavadze (1837 - 1907)
- Gerard Manley Hopkins (1844 — 1889)
- Cordula Wöhler (1845 - 1916)
- Nectarios of Aegina (1846 - 1920)
- Allan MacDonald (1859 - 1905)
- Eleanor Hull (1860 - 1935)
- Vyacheslav Ivanov (1866 - 1949)
- Thérèse of Lisieux (1873 - 1897)
- Charles Péguy (1873 - 1914)
- Rudolf Alexander Schröder (1878–1962)
- Queenie Scott-Hopper (1881–1924)
- Khalil Gibran (1883 — 1931)
- Dòmhnall Ruadh Chorùna (1887–1967)
- Yann-Ber Kalloc'h (1888–1917)
- T. S. Eliot (1888–1965)
- Gabriela Mistral (1889 — 1957)
- Reinhard Sorge (1892 - 1916)
- Saunders Lewis (1893 – 1985)
- Ella H Scharring—Hausen (1894 — 1985)
- Watson Kirkconnell (1895 – 1977)
- Roy Campbell (1900 - 1957)
- Reinhold Schneider (1903 - 1958)
- P. C. Devassia (1906 - 2006)
- W. H. Auden (1907 — 1973)
- Máirtín Ó Direáin (1910 - 1988)
- Czesław Miłosz (1911 — 2004)
- R. S. Thomas (1913 — 2000)
- Thomas Merton (1915 — 1968)
- Dòmhnall Iain Dhonnchaidh (1919 - 1986)
- Anna Kamieńska (1920 - 1986)
- Veniamin Blazhenny (1921 - 1999)
- Richard Wilbur (1921 - 2017)
- Mathew Ulakamthara (1931 - 2022)
- Geoffrey Hill (1932 — 2016)
- Joseph Brodsky (1940 - 1996)
- Frederick Turner (b. 1943)
- Gilbert Luis R. Centina III (1947 - 2020)
- Regina Derieva (1949 - 2013)
- Dana Gioia (b. 1950)
- Anthony Esolen
- Scott Cairns (b. 1954)
- Malcolm Guite (b. 1957)
- Joseph Pearce (b. 1961)
- Rev. Ha Seung Moo (b. 1963)
- Christopher Mwashinga (b. 1965-)

== Examples of Christian poems and notable works ==
- Book of Job - Bible
- Psalms in the Bible ( a collection of prayers, c. 1000 B.C.) - King David
- The Vision of Dorotheus a 4th century epic poem in Homeric Greek about a visit to Heaven, where the Angels are in a military hierarchy similar to the Roman Legions and where Jesus Christ is enthroned like a Roman Emperor
- The Dream of the Rood, a work of Christian epic poetry in Old English believed to date from the 7th century, preserved in the Vercelli Book
- Heliand, an epic poem which retells the life of Jesus Christ in Old Saxon, alliterative verse, and like the story of a Pre-Christian Germanic tribal leader.
- St. Patrick's Breastplate - Old Irish. 8th century prayer for protection
- Old Saxon Genesis
- Piers Plowman (1360 - 1399) - Middle English, an allegory of correct Christian life, written in unrhymed alliterative verse
- The Divine Comedy (1265 - 1321) - Italian. The author, Dante, is guided through Hell and Purgatory by Virgil and through Heaven by Beatrice. Uses complex rhyming (Terza rima). (translation)
- Dies Iræ (13th century) - Thomas of Celano's celebrated sequence on the Last Judgment (Latin text).
- Paradise Lost (1667) and Paradise Regained (1671) - John Milton's English epics on the fall and salvation of the human race. (texts: Paradise Regained and Paradise Lost) See also: Richard Merrell, Australia http://www.richard-2782.net/poindex.htm and http://www.richard-2782.net/poetry.pdf
