= Christiad =

1535 epic poem by Marco Girolamo Vida

- by Marco Girolamo Vida
- Original title: Christias
- Translator: James Gardner, John Cranwell, Edward Granan
- Country: Duchy of Milan
- Language: Latin
- Subject: Life of Jesus
- Genre: Epic poetry
- Published in English: 1535; 491 years ago
- Metre: Dactylic hexameter

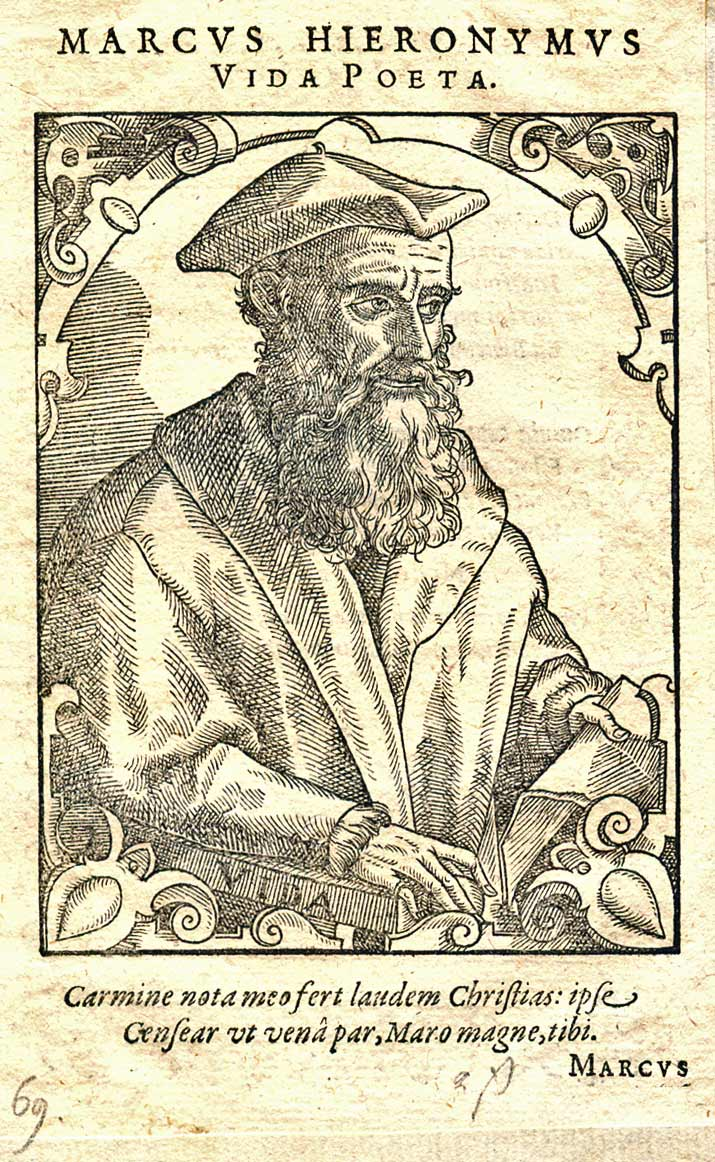
Portrait. The epigram reads "Carmine nota meo fert laudem Christias: ipse / Censear ut venâ par, Maro magne, tibi."

The Christiad (Latin Christias) is an epic poem in six cantos on the life of Jesus Christ by Marco Girolamo (Marcus Hieronymus) Vida modeled on Virgil. It was first published in Cremona in 1535 (see 1535 in poetry). According to Watson Kirkconnell, the Christiad, "was one of the most famous poems of the Early Renaissance". Furthermore, according to Kirkconnell, Vida's, "description of the Council in Hell, addressed by Lucifer, in Book I", was, "a feature later to be copied", by Torquato Tasso, Abraham Cowley, and by John Milton in Paradise Lost. The standard English translations, which render Vida's poem into heroic couplets, were published by John Cranwell in 1768 and by Edward Granan in 1771.

== Modern Editions ==
- Vida, Marco Girolamo. The Christiad: A Latin-English Edition. Edited and translated by Gertrude C. Drake and Clarence A. Forbes. Carbondale and Edwardsville, IL: Southern Illinois University Press, 1978. ISBN 0-8093-0814-2
- Vida, Marco Girolamo. Christiad. Translated by James Gardner. The I Tatti Renaissance Library, no. 39, ed. James Hankins. Cambridge, MA: Harvard University Library, 2009. ISBN 978-0-674-03408-2.
- Vida, Marco Girolamo. Christias. Introduced, edited, translated and commented by Eva von Contzen, Reinhold F. Glei, Wolfgang Polleichtner and Michael Schulze Roberg. Bochumer Altertumswissenschaftliches Colloquium, vol. 91/92. 2 vols. Trier: Wissenschaftlicher Verlag Trier, 2013. ISBN 978-3-86821-435-2 and ISBN 978-3-86821-436-9.
