= Gabriel Vendages de Malapeire =

- Born: 1624
- Died: 1702
- Occupation(s): Parliamentarian, poet

Gabriel Vendages de Malapeire (1624-1702) was a French aristocrat, parliamentarian and poet. He wrote Marian poetry and built a chapel in Toulouse.

== Early life ==
Gabriel Vendages de Malapeire was born in 1624. His father was a parliamentarian.

== Career ==
Vendages de Malapeire was a courtier to the King of France. He was a member of the Acadèmia dels Jòcs Florals. In 1688, he co-founded the Société des Belles-Lettres de Toulouse with Adrian Martel, a lawyer. The society was discontinued in 1699.

Vendages de Malapeire wrote Christian poetry about the Virgin Mary. In 1671, he patronized the construction of the Notre-Dame-du-Mont-Carmel chapel in Toulouse. It was dedicated in 1678. He authored a description of the chapel in 1692, including the paintings he had commissioned for it.

== Death and legacy ==
Vendages de Malapeire died in 1702. His chapel was destroyed in 1806.
