= P. C. Devassia =

Indian Sanskrit scholar and writer

Mahakavi Prof. P.C. Devassia
- Born: 24 March 1906
- Died: 10 October 2006 (aged 100); Nalanchira, Trivandrum, Kerala
- Education: M.A. (Malayalam); M.A. (Sanskrit)
- Occupation: University Professor
- Known for: Indian Sanskrit scholar and writer
- Notable work: Kristubhagavatam; Girigita

Plakkiyil Chacko Devassia, often known as Mahakavi P. C. Devassia (24 March 1906 – 10 October 2006), was a Sanskrit and Malayalam literary scholar, literary translator, and poet from Kerala, India. In 1980, Devassia, a lifelong Christian from the Syro-Malabar Church, one of the 23 Eastern Catholic Churches, won the Sahitya Akademi Award for Sanskrit. The prize was awarded for Devassia's poem Kristubhagavatam, a Mahakavyam, or very high prestige form of Indian epic poetry composed in Classical Sanskrit, but with its traditions transformed into a work of Christian poetry about the life and ministry of Jesus Christ. He has also received the Kerala Sahitya Akademi Award for his overall contributions to Malayalam literature.

== Early life ==
Plakkiyil Chacko Devassia was born into the aristocratic Plakkiyil family, who were Eastern Catholics of the Syro-Malabar Church, on 24 March 1906 at Kudamaloor, Kottayam District, Kingdom of Travancore, British India.

== Education ==
Primary Education : Government Primary School, Kudamaloor.

High School Education: St. Ephrem's H.S. Mannanam (1916-1924).

Intermediate Course: CMS College Kottayam (1925-1927).

Bachelor of Arts: College of Fine Arts Trivandrum (1927-1929).

Master of Arts: two languages Sanskrit and Malayalam from University of Madras (1937)

== Study of Sanskrit ==
He learned the basics of Sanskrit in the traditional way from Sri. Mathu Aashan of Olesha; Kavyas and Natakas from the celebrated scholar Sri. Panthalam Krishna Warrier; Vedas, Upanishads, Champus, Dharma Sutras from Vidyabhooshana Sri. Venkitarama Sharma of Trivandrum; and Vyakarana from Vyakaranabhooshana Sri. Rama Poduval of Trissur.

== Professional career ==
Lecturer in Malayalam at St. Thomas College, Thrissur (1931-1945); Senior Lecturer in Oriental Languages at Sacred Heart College, Thevara (1945-1958); Professor of Malayalam at Mar Ivanios College, Trivandrum (1958-1966); On his retirement in 1966, Devassia received a Fellowship from U.G.C. under which he prepared a complete translation of Somadeva's epic Kathasaritsagara from Sanskrit into Malayalam.

== Positions held ==
- Secretary, the 12th Conference of the Kerala Sahithya Parishad held at Kottayam (1938).
- Vice President, Kerala Chitrakala Samithy, Trichur (1941)
- Member, Malayalam Text book committee of the Travancore-Cochin State (1943).
- Member, Board of Examiners in Malayalam, Universities of Madras, Travancore, Kerala and Calicut.
- Member, Board of studies in Malayalam of the Universities of Madras, Mysore and Kerala.
- Member, Board of studies in Sanskrit, of the Mahatma Gandhi University, Kottayam.
- Member, Editorial Board of All Kerala Sahitya Parishad magazine (1946).
- Member, Academic Council, University of Madras (1947).
- President, Conference of Kerala Kala Parishad held at Tellisseri and Trichur.
- Member, Advisory Board of Malayalam Encyclopedia of the Govt. of Kerala.
- Member, Advisory Board of the Dept. of Cultural Publications, Govt. of Kerala.
- Delegate to the Fifth World Sanskrit Conference held at Varanasi in 1981, where he presented a paper in Sanskrit on "Sanskrit Epics written by Keralites".
- Chairman, Bhasa Mahotsava Committee, Trivandrum (1994).

== Literary activities ==
- One of the Editors of Keralam, a literary monthly published from Trichur (1932-1934).
- Managing Editor of Jayabharatham, a Malayalam monthly published from Thevara (1949-1970).
- Has written Biographical sketches, essays, shortstories and poems in Sanskrit and Malayalam.
- Has contributed a number of Articles on Arts, literature, Upanishads etc. to several leading periodicals.
- Has translated some well known English and Sanskrit works into Malayalam.
- Has broadcast Radio talks and Poems on various subjects from AIR for several years.

== Hobbies ==
Portrait painting and Sculpture were his hobbies. Portraits of both Rabindranath Tagore and John Henry Newman were painted by him in 1932 and '33 and both are still preserved at St. Thomas College, Thrissur.

== List of publications ==
=== Malayalam ===
- Bharata Shilpikal - Biographical sketches (1952).
- Balanagaram - Translation of Boys Town (1953).
- Pathimoonnu Kathakal - 13 short stories (1955).
- Police kathakal - Detective stories in four parts (1957–58).
- Rajaneethi - Translation of Niccolò Machiavelli's - The Prince., a publication of National Sahitya Akademi (1959).
- American Samskaram - Cultural history of America- translation (1962).
- Matham Irupatham Shatakathil - Religion in the 20th Century (1963).
- Oregon Giripatham - Translation of Francis Parkman's The Oregon Trail: Sketches of Prairie and Rocky-Mountain Life (1966).
- Kala Sourabham - Collection of Original Essays on Arts and Literature (1971). Prescribed as text in Kerala, Calicut and M.G. Universities.
- Katha sarith sagaram - a complete translation into Malayalam of Somadeva's Kathasaritsagara (1978).
- Marubhoomiyile Garjitham - Thunder in the wilderness - a short poem in Malayalam on the assassination of John the Baptist (1995).
- Helen -translation of Euripides (1996).
- Vethala kathakal - (1997).

=== Sanskrit ===
- Janakeeya Kavyam - a satirical poem in Sanskrit (1948).
- Kristubhagavatam - the first epic in Sanskrit, depicting the life and teachings of Christ (1977). This work won the National Sahitya Akademi Award in 1980.
- Karshaka geetham - translation into Sanskrit of Vallathol Narayana Menon's Karshakante paattu.
- Poems in phrase of Cardinal Tisserant's, H. H.Marthanda Varma, Father Marcel etc.
- Radio Broadcast of Sanskrit Poems and Talks in Sanskrit on story literature in Sanskrit, the composing of Kristubhagavatam etc. and a multitude of other broadcast in Malayalam.

=== Publication of the works of other authors ===
Devassia has published the following works of Mr. I. C. Chacko.

- Panineeya Pradyotham - a commentary on Panini's Ashtadhyayi which won the National Sahitya Akademi Award in 1956.
- Valmikiyude Lokathil - Critical essays on Valmiki's Ramayana.
- Sabdhangalum Roodharthangalum - Essays on etymological topics.

== Awards received ==
- The Maharani Sethu Parvathibhai Award (1979).
- The National Sahitya Akademi Award (1980).
- The Award of Visva Samskrita Prathishtanam (1981).
- Award of Samskrita Vidyapeetham of Ezhukon (1981).
- Award of Catholic Laity Association (1981).
- Award of the All Kerala Catholic Association (1985).
- Award of Kraisthava Sahitya Samithi (1988).
- I.C. Chacko Memorial Award of the Diocese of Changanachery (1990).
- Sahityacharya Award from the Lourdes Parish, Trivandrum (1993).
- Award of Sri Sankara Samskrita Akademi, Trichur (1993).
- Award for Samagra Sambhavana (Total Contribution ) from the Kerala Sahitya Akademi (1993).
- Sree Sankara Award of Kaladi Sanskrit University (1996).

== Titles obtained ==
- Panditaratnam - Title from the Visva Samskrita Pratishtanam (1981).
- Vidyabhooshanam - Title from the Sri Sankara Samskrita Akademi, Trichur (1993).
