= Kristubhagavatam =

Kristubhagavatam: A Mahakavya in Sanskrit based on the life of Jesus Christ (Sanskrit: क्रिस्तुभागवतम्; Kristubhāgavatam or Kristu-Bhāgavatam) is a Sanskrit-language epic poem about the life of Jesus Christ, based on the New Testament, and composed by P. C. Devassia (1906–2006), a Sanskrit scholar and Catholic poet from Kerala, India. As a mahakavya, it revives the traditions of the most prestigious verse form of Indian epic poetry, and is accordingly characterized by ornate and elaborate descriptions.

Similarly to the Christian poetry by fellow Catholic poet Marko Marulić, who believed that, "pagan myth and poetry gained a certain legitimacy when employed in the service of theology", Devassia's poem is filled with multiple references and comparisons to well known stories about the gods, avatars, and demigods of Hinduism and even to figures from recent Indian history like Mohandas Gandhi, in order to point its readers towards Christianity and Jesus Christ.

Composed in 1976 and first published in 1977, the poem consists of 33 cantos and over 1600 verses. For composing the Kristubhagavatam, Devassia won several awards, including the Sahitya Akademi Award for Sanskrit (1980).

== Contents ==
Kristubhāgavatam : Canto Titles (selected)
	English	Sanskrit
1.	The sage meets the Virgin	Kanyakādarśanam
2.	The betrothal	Pratiśrutiḥ
3.	The vision of Zacharias	Sakharyasya Divyadarśanam
4.	The Annunciation	Maṅgalavijñāpanam
5.	The Visitation	Bandhugṛhābhigamanam
6.	A journey to Bethlehem	Janmadeśagamanam
7.	The birth of Jesus	Bhagavato Yeśoravatāra
8.	The Presentation in the Temple	Devālayasasamarpaṇam
9.	The arrival of the Magi, The slaughter of the Innocents	Vidvadāgamanaṃ Herodakṛtaṃ Śiśumāraṇaṃ ca
10.	The childhood of Jesus	Yeśoḥ Ṥauśavam
17.	The Sermon on the Mount – I	Giriprabhaṣaṇam – I
18.	The Sermon on the Mount – II	Giriprabhāṣaṇam – II
32.	The Resurrection of Jesus	Yeśorutthānam
33.	The Ascension	Svargarohaṇam

The 1977 published version of the Kristubhagavatam contains over 1600 Sanskrit verses divided into 33 cantos, perhaps corresponding to the number of years lived by Jesus. Each Sanskrit verse is accompanied by an English translation. The poem and the translation comprise 434 pages. Titles of selected cantos, in both English and Sanskrit, are listed in the table at right.

The published poem contains a 3-page preface by the author, in which he described the process by which he composed the poem over approximately 5 years. He wrote that "I had to face a difficult problem":

On the one hand, Christ is a historical figure, and I must narrate his life objectively; on the other hand, a Sanskrit Mahakavya must conform to certain norms laid down by Sanskrit rhetoricians. These norms require free play of the imagination. This is often incompatible with objective narrative. I did not fancy the idea of translating the Bible into Sanskrit. I wanted my work to be really a Mahakavya, a literary piece, which anyone conversant with Sanskrit language should be able to read and enjoy. I have taken as my guide Fulton Oursler, who, in his "The Greatest Story Ever Told", tells the story of Christ and fills in the details left out in the gospels by means of his fertile imagination.

Selected Verses, with Translation:
Canto I: The Sage meets the Virgin
Canto XII: The Temptation

English translation (by author)

I.1. May the same brilliant star, which guided the Wise Men, who set out to worship the Lord of the Universe born in a stable, shine again in the path of my poetic endeavours, so that they have a happy ending!

XII.1. Jesus, after being baptized by John, was led by the Holy Spirit to the wilderness to overcome the temptation of the devil.

XII.3. Keeping his mind steady like a lamp unexposed to the wind, He performed penance with concentration, seeing His self with His soul.

Sanskrit verses

I.1. जगत्पतिं गोकुलजातमर्चितुं विपश्चितः संचरतो निनाय या |

पुनश्च काव्याध्वनि मे विराजतां समुज्ज्वला सैव शुभाय तारका || १ ||

XII.1. योहनस्नपितो येशुर्नीतः स परमात्मना |

मरुस्थलं स्वयं जेतुं पिशाचस्य विलोभनम् || १ ||

XII.3. यथा दीपं निवातस्थं कृत्वा चित्तमचञ्चलम् |

एकाग्रेणात्मनात्मानं स पश्यन्नतपत्तपः || ३ ||

Sanskrit (transliterated)

I.1. Jagatpatiṃ gokulajātam arcituṃ vipaścitaḥ saṃcarato nināya yā ।

punaśca kāvyādhvani me virājatāṃ samujjvalā saiva śubhāya tārakā ॥ 1 ॥

XII.1. Yohanasnapīto Yeśur nītaḥ sa paramātmanā |

marusthalaṃ svayaṃ jetuṃ piśācasya vilobhanam ॥ 1 ॥

XII.3. Yathā dīpaṃ nivātasthaṃ kŗtvā cittam-acañcalam |

ekāgreņātmanātmānaṃ sa paśyan na tapattapaḥ ॥ 3 ॥

The author, a devout Christian, also stated that

I grew up in an atmosphere of Sanskrit literature and I have been dealing with the Sanskrit classics in and outside the classroom either as a student, or a teacher for the last sixty years. Naturally some of that cultural heritage cannot but appear even in a work on Christ. Moreover, I believe our task today is to underscore the similarities and the points in common between different cultures and religions rather than emphasise the differences.

Selected Sanskrit verses, along with the author's English translations, are shown at right.

== Reception & commentary ==
For composing the Kristubhagavatam, Devassia won several awards, including the Sahitya Akademi Award for Sanskrit (1980), the Maharani Sethu Parvati Bayi Prize (1979), and the Catholic Laity Association Award (1981). The published poem also contained commentaries by V. Raghavan (Foreword), K. Kunjunni Raja (Introduction), Joseph Cardinal Parecattil (Appreciation), S. Venkitasubramonia Iyer (Appreciation), M. H. Sastri (Appreciation), K. R. Srinivasa Iyengar (Appreciation), and Charudeva Shastri (Appreciation).

In his foreword, V. Raghavan wrote that the first efforts of the Christian missionaries to produce Christian literature in Sanskrit resulted in "translations of the Bible, which were all miserable." In contrast the Kristubhagavatam is the first major Sanskrit poem on the "whole life of Christ," and Devassia "follows all the norms and practices of the Mahakavya, but does not indulge in too many figures or descriptions.... The style is simple and clear, endowed as it is with the Gunas of 'Prasada' and 'Saukumarya.' Furthermore,

Not only the incidents, the miracles, etc. are faithfully given, but also the famous sayings of Christ... are incorporated in appropriate terms. [There is also] inclusion of apt analogies and comparisons with personalities and situations in the two Sanskrit Epics, the Ramayana and the Mahabharata, as also in the Puranas, and occasionally with some well-known happenings in modern India, like the killing of Gandhiji.... No effort is spent to make the poem over-coloured or loaded with displays of learning or skill: it is always simple and straightforward, in the much valued 'Vaidarbhi' style.

Raghavan added that in Devassia's state of Kerala, "where Sanskrit and Malayalam have blended into a homogeneous amalagam, the community of Sanskritists is a commonwealth of Hindus, Christians and Muslims.... one finds here an Indian approach and an Indian presentation of the life of Christ."

Mar Joseph Parecattil, Archbishop of Ernakulum and a Catholic cardinal (in the Syro-Malabar Catholic Church, a church in full communion with the Roman Catholic Church), and recent President of the Catholic Bishops' Conference of India, wrote in his Appreciation that...

I have no hesitation in saying that this "magnum opus" of prof. P. C. Devassia will certainly throw open the doors for those Sanyasins and other Sanskrit scholars, who usually do not go in for the life of Christ written in western languages, to have access to Christ in the idioms and expressions of a language with which they are familiar

K. R. Srinivasa Iyengar wrote that "The Gospel-story is retained in essentials, but...

...the sonority of Sanskrit gives a fresh morning splendour and resonance to Jesus' divine ministry. Mary held Joseph's hand as Arundhati did Vasishtha's; Just as Vasudeva hid his son Krishna in Nanda's house, so did Joseph take Jesus to Egypt for his safety; Lazarus' sisters embraced him as he emerged out of his tomb, even as Devayani embraced Kacha as he revived after death.... in betraying Jesus with a kiss, wasn't Judas anticipating Godse who was to kill the Mahatma after first saluting him? The similes come naturally, and rather bring out the basic unity of texture that binds all human history.

In summary, K. R. Srinivasa Iyengar concluded that the Kristubhagavatam is...

...a double demonstration, firstly that Sanskrit is by no means a 'dead language' but is very much and gloriously alive; and secondly, that Jesus is not the Christians' Messiah alone, but one of the pathfinders, one of the redeemers, of humanity as a whole. His message of Love has a permanent and potent significance for all mankind.

== Editions ==
- Devassia, P. C. (1977). Kristubhagavatam: A mahakavya in Sanskrit based on the life of Jesus Christ. Trivandrum, Kerala, India: Jayabharatam. ASIN B0000D6PEI. OCLC 28795465. ASIN B0000D6PEI

== See also ==
- Christianity in Kerala
- Religious pluralism
- Sanskrit revival
