= Marco Girolamo Vida =

Italian bishop (c. 1485–1566)

The Most Reverend Ludovico Gonzaga
- Bishop of Alba
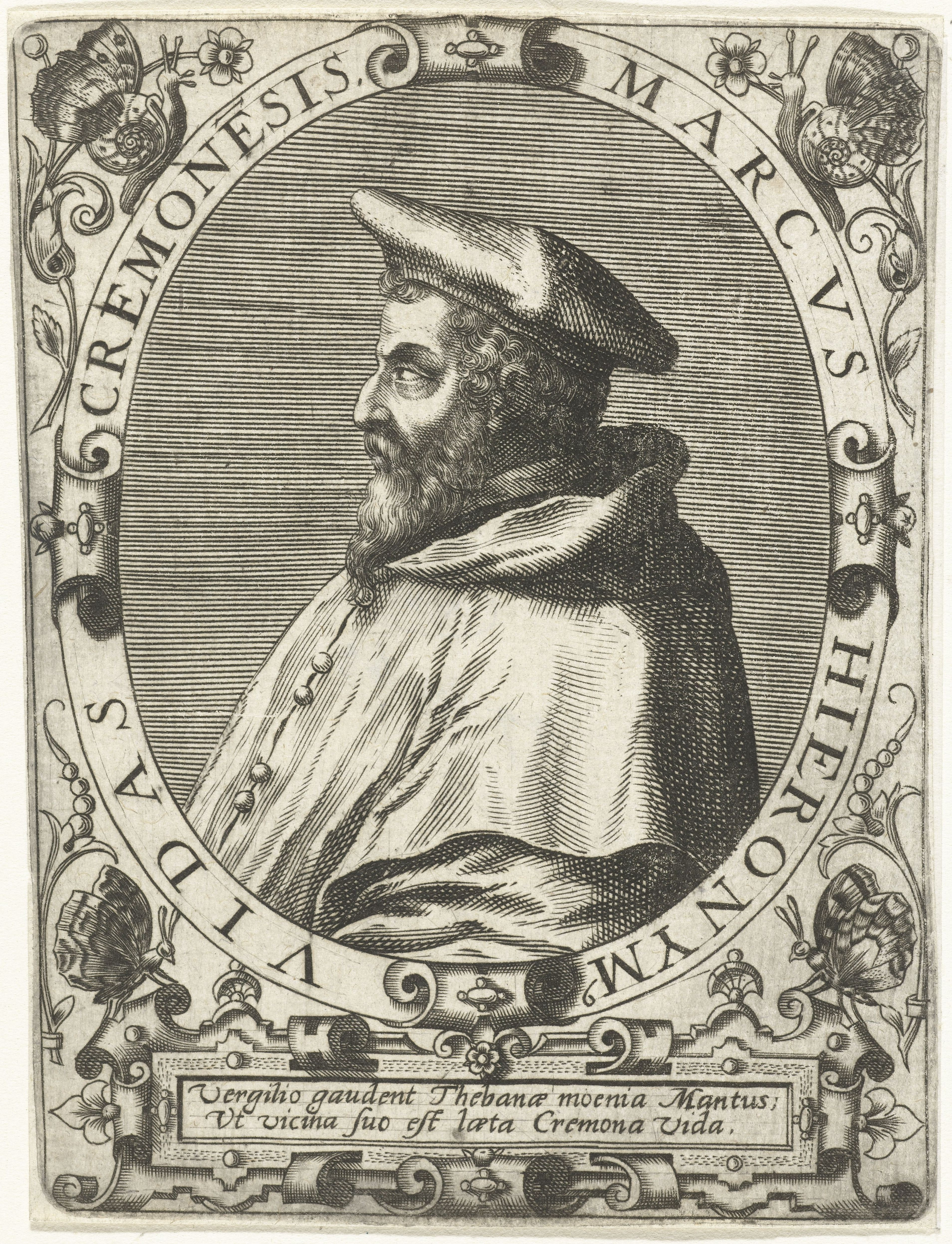
- Roman Catholic prelate
- Church: Catholic Church
- Diocese: Diocese of Alba
- In office: 1533–1566
- Predecessor: Giuliano Visconti
- Successor: Leonardo Marini

Orders
- Consecration: 7 February 1533 by Pope Clement VII

Personal details
- Born: 1485 Cremona, Republic of Venice
- Died: 27 September 1566 (aged 80–81) Alba, Duchy of Mantua

Marco Girolamo Vida or Marcus Hieronymus Vida (1485 – September 27, 1566) was an Italian humanist, bishop and important poet in Christian Latin literature.

== Life ==
Vida was born at Cremona, then part of the Duchy of Milan. He was the son of the consular (patrician) Guglielmo Vida, and Leona Oscasale. He had two brothers: Giorgio, a captain in the service of the Republic of Venice, and Girolamo, a canon of the cathedral chapter of Cremona. He also had three sisters: Lucia, Elena, and a third whose name is unknown.

He began his studies in Cremona, under the local grammarian, Nicolò Lucari. He was then sent to Mantua, and then Bologna and Padua. It is conjectured that it was in Mantua, where the Canons Regular had a school, that Marco took the habit, perhaps around 1505. By about 1510 he had been granted several benefices: in the diocese of Cremona at Ticengo, then at Monticelli (diocese of Parma), then at Solarolo Monestirolo, where he held the office of provost, and finally at Paderno, where he held the title of archpriest.

Vida joined the court of Pope Leo X and was given the Priory of San Silvestro at Frascati Pope Clement VII appointed him a Protonotary Apostolic. He became bishop of Alba on 7 February 1533. In 1544, however, the diocese and the entire marquisate of Monseratto were occupied by the armies of Francis I of France, as part of his long war with the Spanish, and the Bishop was forced to retreat to his benefices in Cremona. Bishop Vida attended the Council of Trent in May and June 1546, and again in March 1547. In 1549 and 1550 he became involved in a controversy between his native Cremona and the city of Pavia, helping to prepare the brief for his fellow citizens to be argued before the Spanish governor of Milan, Ferrante Gonzaga. The written defense was published as the Cremonensium Orationes III of clear Ciceronian influence.

On 29 March 1564 Bishop Vida wrote his last will and testament. He died on 27 September 1566.

== Works ==
Vida wrote a considerable amount of Renaissance Latin poetry, both secular and sacred, in classical style, particular the style of Virgil. Among his best-known works are the didactic poem in three books, De arte poetica (On the Art of Poetry), partly inspired by Horace, and Scacchia Ludus ("The Game of Chess"). Both poems, after circulating in manuscript and seeing unauthorised publications, were first published in 1527.

According to H.J.R. Murray, Vida's poem about Chess, "attained a great popularity in the 16th c.: it was repeatedly printed, and translations or imitations exist in most of the European languages."

Murray continues, "In the opening lines, Vida tells how he has written this poem, on a subject never before attempted by the poets, at the insistence of Federigo Fregoso, and he expresses the hope that it might afford some relaxation to Guiliano de Medici in the heavy task which he and his brother (Giovanni, later Pope Leo X, a keen chess-player), had undertaken in repelling the French invaders of Italy. V.d. Lasa has shown that the allusions to Italian events point definitively to the early summer of 1513 as the date of the poem. Vida was then aged twenty-three. The aim of the poem is to describe in Virgilian Latin a game of chess played between Apollo and Mercury in the presence of the other gods. Vida apparently experienced some difficulty in deciding on a suitable classical nomenclature for the Bishop and Rook. In the earlier version the Bishops are represented as centaurs with bows and arrows; in later version the Centaurs have disappeared and the Bishop is an Archer. In the earlier version the Rooks are represented as Cyclops... In the later version the Rooks appear as warring towers borne upon the backs of elephants... Elsewhere in the poem the name Elephas is used, generally, however, with an allusion to the tower it is supposed to carry on its back... The extraordinary thing is that Vida's choice of names should have caught the popular fancy. All three terms - Archer for the Bishop, Elephant and Tower (Castle) for the Rook - were adopted by players in different parts of Western Europe. Even the term Amazon, which he used for the Queen, was tried by the writers of chess books."

His major work was the Latin epic poem Christiados libri sex ("The Christiad in Six Books"), an epic poem about the Life of Christ in the style and the literary language of Virgil.

He began work on "The Christiad" at the request of Pope Leo X, who was elected in the 1513 Conclave, but Vida did not complete it until the early 1530s. It was published in 1535, well after the pope's death on 1 December 1521.

According to Watson Kirkconnell, the Christiad, "was one of the most famous poems of the Early Renaissance". Furthermore, according to Kirkconnell, Vida's, "description of the Council in Hell, addressed by Lucifer, in Book I", was, "a feature later to be copied", by Torquato Tasso, Abraham Cowley, and by John Milton in Paradise Lost. The standard English translations, which render Vida's poem into heroic couplets, were published by John Cranwell in 1768 and by Edward Granan in 1771.

== Editions ==
- A San Lorenzo martire, di m. Gerolamo Vida; versione dell'abb. Jacopo Bernardi (in Italian). Genova: Tip. del R. I. de' sordo-muti. 1862.
- A San Pietro (in Italian). Pinerolo: Giuseppe Chiantore tipografo. 1867.
- Arte poetica, libri tre di Marco Girolamo Vida; tradotta dal professore Giovanni Pirani (in Italian). Cesena: Tipografia G.C. Biasini. 1864.
- Battaglia de' scacchi di monsig. Vida, ridotta in ottaua rima da Girolamo Zanucchi da Conegliano ... (in Italian). In Treuigi: presso Angelo Mazzolini. 1589.
- Cinque lettere di Marco Girolamo Vida pubblicate da Ferdinando Gabotto per le nozze Cipolla-Vittone (in Italian). Pinerolo: Tipografia sociale. 1890.
- Cremonensium orationes III (in Latin). Cremona: Giovanni Muzio & Bernardino Locheta. 1550.
- Dei bachi da seta. Poema di Marco Girolamo Vida alla marchesa Isabella d'Este tradotto in verso sciolto da Marco Sandi fra gli Arcadi di Roma Lastene Calcidico ... e pubblicat in onore delle faustissime nozze della nobil donna Giustina da Mosto col signor Giuseppe Castagna Bernardi (in Italian). Venezia: dalla tipografia di Alvisopoli. 1815.
- Della cristiade. Libro I, di Girolamo Vida vescovo d'Alba; recato in versi italiani da Giuseppe Wcovich Lazzari paroco (in Italian). Venezia: Andreola. 1840.
- Epicedion in funere reuerendi domini domini Oliuerii Caraphaae Neapolitani cardinalis episcopi Hostiensis (in Latin). (Absolutus Romae: in sacris aedibus Pacis nostrae, decimo kalendas Februarias. 1511.
- Frammento di un poemetto inedito che ha per titolo Marci Hieronymi Vidae 13. pugilum certamen con osservazioni (in Italian). Milano: presso Francesco Fusi editore de' Classici Italiani. 1818.
- Il bombyx di M. G. Vida, Michele Manfredi (in Italian). Cerignola: Scienza e diletto. 1912.
- I bachi da seta poema latino di Marco Girolamo Vida cremonese vescovo d'Alba tradotto in verso italiano da Contardo Barbieri ... (in Italian). In Cremona: per Lorenzo Manini regio stampatore. 1792.
- Il gioco degli scacchi poema latino di Marco Girolamo Vida cremonese vescovo d'Alba tradotto in verso italiano da Contardo Barbieri modenese ... (in Italian). In Modena: per gli eredi di Bartolomeo Soliani stampatori ducali. 1791.
- Inni cinque, di monsignor Girolamo Vida; volgarizzati da Pietro Vigorelli (in Italian). Cremona; tipografia Fezzi alias Ottolini. 1857.|
- Inni di Girolamo Vida ai santi Lorenzo e Cassiano martiri, volgarizzati dall'ab. Jacopo Bernardi (in Italian). Alba: Sansoldi. 1867.
- Inno alla Gran Vergine Madre, Versione in isciolti italiani del prof. Domenico Fogliardi (in Italian). Città di Castello: Tip. Dello Stab. S. Lapi. 1888.
- Inno alla pace di M. Girolamo Vida tradotto dal C. A. M. P (in Latin). Padova: tipografia Bettoni. 1814.
- La Cristiade, di Marco Girolamo Vida da Cremona vescovo di Alba; trasportata dal verso latino all'italiano da Tommaso Perrone sacerdote secolare da Lecce . Con argomento ad ogni libro e annotazioni messevi per chiarezza e ornamento di alcuni luoghi. Aggiuntavi anche nel fin di essa la traduzione di due altri poemi dello stesso autore; De'bachi, e Del giuoco degli scacchi (in Italian). In Napoli: nella stamperia di Gennaro Muzio. 1733.
- La disfida dei 13 campioni, frammento d'un poemetto inedito di M. Girolamo Vida; tradotto in versi sciolti italiani con cenni biografici, cenni storici e note da Pietro Castiglioni (in Italian). Pavia: Bizzoni. 1845.
- La poetica di Girolamo Vida, tradotta da Baldassarre Romano (in Italian). Palermo: dalla tipografia di Filippo Solli. 1832.
- La scaccheida o sia Il giuoco degli scacchi, poema latino; volgarizzato in ottava rima dal sig. Gianfranco Masdeu (in Italian). Venezia: presso A. Zatta. 1774.
- L'arte poetica, Marco Girolamo Vida; introduzione, testo, traduzione e note a cura di Raffaele Girardi (in Italian). Bari: Adriatica Editrice. 1982.
- L'inno su l'eucaristia, tradotto da Romualdo Sassi in esametri volgari (in Italian). Fabriano: Tip. Gentile. 1933.
- M. H. Vidae Christias, edidit Aug. Hubner (in Latin). Nissae: J. A. Muller. 1849.
- M. Hier. Vidae ... Dialogi de rei publicae dignitate (in Latin). (Cremonae: in Ciuitatis Palatio apud Vincentium Contem. 1556.
- M. Hieronimi Vidae ... Opera, quae quidem extant, omnia. Nempe, Christiados, hoc est, de Christi uita, gestis, ac morte, libri 6. De poetica, lib. 3. De bombycum cura ac usu, lib. 2. De scacchorum ludo, lib. 1. Item, eiusdem Hymni, odae, bucolica, una cum alijs. Accesserunt ... indices ... additi (in Latin). Basileae: per Balthasarem Lasium & Thomam Platterum. 1537.
- M. Hieronymi Vidae ... Opera, quae quidem extant, omnia: nempe, Christiados, hoc est, de Christi vita, gestis, ac morte, libri 6. De poetica, lib. 3. De Bombycum cura, ac vsu, lib. 2. De scacchorum ludo, lib. 1. Item, eiusdem Hymni, odae, bucolica, vna cum alijs. Accesserunt ... Indices ... additi (in Latin). Melchiorre Sessa! (Venetijs: per Melchiorem Sessam. 1538.
- M. Hieronymi Vidae Cremonensis De arte poetica libri tres (in Latin). Parisijs: ex officina Roberti Stephani e regione Scholae decretorum. 1527.
- M. Hieronymi Vidae Cremonensis, Albae Episcopi ... Presbytero Bartholomaeo Botta, canonico papiensi interprete (in Latin). Ticinii: apud Hieronymum Bartolum. 1569.
- M. Hieronymi Vidae Cremonensis, Albae episcopi Christias, presbytero Bartholomaeo Botta, canonico Papiensi interprete (in Latin). Ticini: apud Hieronymum Bartolum. 1569.
- Marci Hieronymi Vidae Cremonensis, Albae episcopi, hymnus de Maria Virgine (in Latin). Firmi: Bacher. 1865.
- Marci Hieronymi Vidae Cremonensis, Albae episcopi, Opera. Quorum catalogum sequens pagella continet (in Latin). Lugduni: apud Seb. Gryphium. 1541.
- Orazione inedita del vescovo d'Alba mons Girolamo Vida, recitata nel primo Concilio provinciale di Milano, presente s. Carlo Borromeo, pubblicata con proemio e note da Don Lorenzo Giampaoli in occasione del giorno onomastico di mons. Francesco Giampaolo (in Italian). Ferrara: Tip. Economica. 1890.
- La poetica libri tre, di monsignor Girolamo Vida cremonese; in sciolto italiano recata dal cremonese trad. del dott. Giovanni Chiosi (in Italian). Cremona: Feraboli. 1833.

== Notes ==
=== Sources ===
Chisholm, Hugh, ed. (1911). "Vida, Marco Girolamo" . Encyclopædia Britannica. Vol. 28 (11th ed.). Cambridge University Press.

== Bibliography ==
- For a biography, background, comments on the main poems, and full study of the Christiad, see M. Di Cesare, Vida's Christiad and Vergilian Epic, New York: Columbia University Press, 1964.
- For a detailed bibliography of editions and translations of all his works, see M. Di Cesare, Bibliotheca Vidiana, Florence: Sansoni, 1974.)
- A translation of his De arte poetica by Christopher Pitt can be found in the 19th volume of the collection English Poets edited by Alexander Chalmers.
- Gardner, James (trans.), Marco Girolamo Vida. Christiad (Cambridge, Mass.: Harvard University Press, 2009) (The I Tatti Renaissance library, 39).
- Lancetti, Vencenzo (1831). Della vita e degli scritti di Marco Girolamo Vida (in Italian). Milano: Giuseppe Crespi. pp. 8–61.
- Schizzi (Conte), Folchino (1840). Sulle principali opere di Marco Girolamo Vida, e sull'utilita in generale dello studio della lingua latina (in Italian). Resnati. pp. 7–16.
- Marcus Hieronymus Vida, Poeticorum libri tres, edited by Agnieszka Paulina Lew, serie XV, vol. 99, Klassische Sprachen und Literaturen, Peter Lang Verlag, Frankfurt am Main 2011, ISBN 9783631580820
- Marci Herionymi Vidae...Christiados Libri Sex (in Latin). Antwerp: Johan Steelsius, 1536.
