= Beccán mac Luigdech =

Beccán mac Luigdech was a 7th-century Irish composer of Christian poetry and monk of Iona. He is known for having composed two vernacular poems, Fo réir Choluimb ("Bound to Colum") and Tiugraind Beccáin ("The last verses of Beccán"), which were written c. 640 in praise of St Columba, the founder of Iona. Along with Amra Choluim Cille, the fragment of the Life of St Cumméne (Cummian) and Adomnán's Life of Columba, the poems offer a contemporary glimpse of the monastic familia of Iona in the 7th century. Beccán has been identified with the Beccán solitarius ("hermit, anchorite") who along with Ségéne, abbot of Iona, was addressed in a letter written by Cumméne in c. 632–33 concerning the Easter controversy. He may also be the Beccán of Rùm, whose death is recorded in the entry for 677 in the Annals of Ulster.

== Secondary sources ==
- Charles-Edwards, T.M.. Early Christian Ireland. Cambridge: Cambridge University Press, 2000.
- Ó Cróinín, Dáibhí. Early medieval Ireland, 400-1200. London: Longman, 1995.
