= Catharina Regina von Greiffenberg =

Austrian poet of the Baroque era

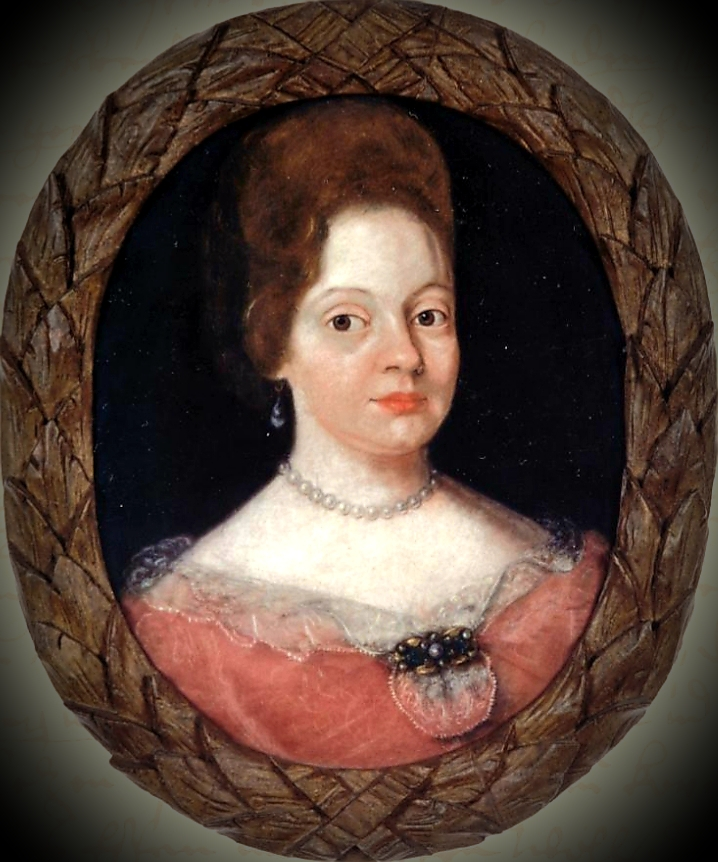
Portrait of Catharina Regina von Greiffenberg

Catharina Regina von Greiffenberg (7 September 1633, Viehdorf — 10 April 1694, Nuremberg) was an Austrian poet of the Baroque era. Greiffenberg is one of the most significant German-language writers of the early modern era. Her work is regularly profoundly personal, often taking the form of an internal monologue.
