= Eva von Contzen =

German professor (born 1984)

Eva von Contzen (born 1984 in Erkelenz, Germany) is Professor of English Literature including the Literatures of the Middle Ages at the University of Freiburg, Germany, where she is also the Director of the Centre for Medieval Studies (Mittelalterzentrum).

Von Contzen is a literary historian and medievalist with a strong focus on narrative theory, especially historical narratology, narrative and narration in medieval literature, the history and development of literary forms including lists and enumerations, reception studies, in particular the reception of classical literature, the history of the epic, and contemporary retellings of ancient and medieval material. Other research interests include cognitive literary studies and medievalism, that is, the reception of the Middle Ages, broadly speaking, in post-medieval times.

== Career ==
Eva von Contzen completed her M.A. in English and Classics at the Ruhr University Bochum in 2009, where she also earned her PhD in 2012. Between 2013 and 2014, she was a junior fellow at the Freiburg Institute for Advanced Studies (FRIAS). She worked, then, as an assistant professor in Freiburg and Bochum, until her appointment as Tenure-Track Professor at the University of Freiburg in 2017. In 2018, she was visiting professor at the Centre for Medievalism Studies of the University of Toronto. She was appointed full professor in 2023, and she currently holds the Chair of English Literature including the Literatures of the Middle Ages at the University of Freiburg.

From 2017 to 2023, von Contzen was the principal investigator of the ERC Starting Grant "Lists in Literature and Culture: Towards a Listology". In 2022, she held a two-month fellowship at the Einstein Center Chronoi, in Berlin. In 2023, she was awarded an ERC Consolidator Grant, "Retelling and Repetition: Towards a Literary History of Derivation", a project which is currently ongoing. She was a member of the "Junges Kolleg" of the North Rhine-Westphalia Academy for Sciences, Humanities and the Arts (Nordrhein-Westfälische Akademie der Wissenschaften und der Künste) and The Academy of Sciences and Literature, Mainz (Akademie der Wissenschaften und der Literatur Mainz). She has been an elected member of the Heidelberg Academy of Sciences and Humanities (Heidelberger Akademie der Wissenschaften) and the Academia Europea since 2024.

Eva von Contzen is founding editor and co-editor of the journal New Chaucer Studies: Pedagogy and Profession as well as co-editor of the journal Anglia.

== Selected publications ==
Books

- Literary Lists. A Short History of Form and Function. London: Palgrave, 2023. (with Roman Alexander Barton and Anne Rüggemeier) ISBN 978-3-031-28371-0.
- The Scottish Legendary. Towards a Poetics of Hagiographic Narration. Manchester: Manchester University Press, 2016. ISBN 9780719095962.

Edited volumes

- Enlistment: Lists in Medieval and Early Modern Literature. Columbus: The Ohio State University Press, 2022. (co-edited with James Simpson) ISBN 978-0-8142-1522-7.
- Enacting the Bible in Late Medieval and Early Modern Drama. Manchester: Manchester University Press, 2020. (co-edited with Chanita Goodblatt) ISBN 9781526131591.
- Handbuch Historische Narratologie. Stuttgart: Metzler, 2019. (co-edited with Stefan Tilg) ISBN 978-3-476-04713-7.
- Narratologie und mittelalterliches Erzählen. Autor, Erzähler, Perspektive, Zeit und Raum. Berlin: de Gruyter, 2018. (co-edited with Florian Kragl) ISBN 9783110565478.
- Risikogesellschaften: Literatur- und geschichtswissenschaftliche Perspektiven. Bielefeld: Transcript, 2018. (co-edited with Tobias Huff and Peter Itzen) ISBN 978-3-8376-4323-7.
- Sanctity as Literature in Medieval Britain. Manchester: Manchester University Press, 2015. (co-edited with Anke Bernau) ISBN 9780719089701.

Articles (selection)

- "Camilla's Traces: Movement as an Analytical Key to Literary History." Orbis Litterarum (2024). (co-authored with Karin Kukkonen) DOI: doi.org/10.1111/oli.12443.
- "Chrononarratology: Modelling Historical Change for Narrative Theory." Narrative 1 (2022): 26-46. (co-authored mit Dorothee Birke und Karin Kukkonen) DOI:doi.org/10.1353/nar.2022.0001.
- "Mediävist*innen von morgen fördern. Herausforderungen und Chancen." Das Mittelalter 26 (2021, Special Issue Mediävistik 2021: Positionen, Strategien, Visionen): 87-101. (with Albrecht Fuess and Jonathan Reinert) DOI: doi.org/10.17885/heiup.mial.2021.1.24311
- "Theorising Lists in Literature: Towards a Listology." Lists and Catalogues in Ancient Literature and Beyond. Towards a Poetics of Enumeration. Eds. Rebecca Lämmle, Cédric Scheidegger Lämmle, and Katharina Wesselmann. Berlin: de Gruyter, 2020. 35-45. DOI: doi.org/10.1515/9783110712230-003.
- "Experience, Affect, and Literary Lists." Partial Answers 2 (2018): 315-27.
- "Narrative and Experience in Medieval Literature: Author, Narrator, and Character Revisited." Narratologie und mittelalterliches Erzählen. Autor, Erzähler, Perspektive, Zeit und Raum. Eds. Eva von Contzen and Florian Kragl. Berlin: de Gruyter, 2018. 61-80. DOI: doi.org/10.1515/9783110566536-004.
- "Diachrone Narratologie und historische Erzählforschung. Eine Bestandsaufnahme und ein Plädoyer." ['Diachronic Narratologe and Historical Narrative Theory. Status quo and a Plea'] Beiträge zur mediävistischen Erzählforschung 1 (2018): 18-38. DOI: doi.org/10.25619/BmE201816.
- "Unnatural Narratology and Premodern Narratives: Historicizing a Form." Journal of Literary Semantics 146 (2017): 1-23.
- "The Limits of Narration: Lists and Literary History." Style 3 (2016): 241-60. DOI: doi.org/10.1515/jls-2017-0001.
- "Why Medieval Literature Does Not Need the Concept of Social Minds: Exemplarity and Collective Experience." Narrative 2 (2015, Special Issue "Social Minds in Factual and Fictional Narration"): 140-53. Winner of the Phelan Prize for the Best Essay in Narrative. DOI: doi.org/10.1353/nar.2015.0013.
- "Why We Need a Medieval Narratology: A Manifesto." Diegesis: Interdisciplinary E-Journal for Narrative Research 2 (2014): 1-21. URL: https://www.diegesis.uni-wuppertal.de/index.php/diegesis/article/download/170/223.
