= John Cranwell =

English cleric and poet

John Cranwell (died 1793) was an English poet and cleric.

Cranwell studied at Sidney Sussex College, Cambridge (BA, 1747; MA, 1751). Having taken orders, he was elected to a fellowship by his college, and received the living of Abbotts Ripton, Huntingdonshire, which he held for twenty-six years. He died on 17 April 1793.

Cranwell translated two Latin poems in the heroic couplet, Isaac Hawkins Brown's De animi immortalitate (A Poem on the Immortality of the Soul, 1765), and Marcus Hieronymus Vida's Christiad (1768).
