= Mukta Sarvagod =

Indian Dalit writer and activist (1922–2004)

Mukta Sarvagod (1922–2004) was an Indian Dalit writer and social activist from Maharashtra. She is known for her autobiography in Marathi, Mitleli Kawade (transl. Closed Doors), which is considered a significant work in the field of Dalit literature.

== Biography ==
Mukta Sarvagod was born in 1922 in the Mahar community of Maharasthra. Her father worked in the railyways.

Sarvagod was a dedicated activist associated with the Ambedkarite movement who belonged to an earlier generation of Dalit activists. As a social worker, she was active in both urban areas like Mumbai and Pune and in rural parts of western Maharashtra, and established 19 women's associations. She also did community service at Baba Amte’s ashram in Anandvan.

Her autobiography, Mitleli Kawade, details the experiences of Dalit women, including the hardships and cruelty they faced. In her writing, Sarvagod explored the tensions between Gandhian and Ambedkarite political ideologies within the social work movements. Her work is noted for its critique of internal community issues, such as superstition, alongside its protest against caste discrimination.

Mitleli Kawade has been analyzed by scholars in the context of Dalit feminism and life writing, and it is included in academic studies of the genre, such as Sharmila Rege's Writing Caste/Writing Gender: Narrating Dalit Women's Testimonios.

== Works ==
- Sarvagauda, Mukta (1983). Mitleli Kavade [Closed Doors] (in Marathi). Amalner: Chetashri Prakashan.

== See also ==
- Babytai Kamble
- Urmila Pawar
- Kumud Pawde
