= Marankala =

Autobiography by Janabai Kachru Girhe

- Author: Janabai Kachru Girhe
- Language: Marathi
- Subject: Dalit women's experiences, caste discrimination, patriarchy
- Genre: Autobiography, Dalit literature
- Published: 1992
- Publisher: Girhe Prakashan

Marankala (lit. Deathly Pains) is an autobiography by Indian writer Janabai Kachru Girhe. It is recognised as a significant work in Dalit literature for the portrayal of the struggles of a nomadic community and the challenges of women's education. It was written in Marathi and first published in 1992.

== Background ==
Janabai Kachru Girhe, born in 1958, belongs to the Gopal nomadic community, a Dalit group in India. Her autobiography, Marankala (1992), provides an account of her life experiences, shedding light on the struggles faced by Dalit women due to the intersecting oppressions of caste and patriarchy.

The narrative explores various facets of her life, including challenges related to food scarcity, community dynamics, labor, and the resistance encountered when attempting to pursue education. For instance, Girhe recounts how her community viewed studying as detrimental to her character, leading to a village council (panchayat) imposing a fine on her family for trying to educate her. The title of the book, Marankala, is inspired from her experience of being a girl in such a community, which she says "is like a 'boon' to suffer eternal pain or marankala (deathly pain) – pain that takes one almost to the gates of death."

== Significance ==
Marankala is frequently cited and analysed in academic discourse concerning Dalit literature and feminist studies in India. It is considered to be the first autobiographical narrative of a woman from the gopal community. Sharmila Rege have included extracts from Girhe's narrative in their critical works, such as Writing Caste Writing Gender: Narrating Dalit Women's Testimonios, highlighting its importance in understanding the lived experiences of Dalit women. The autobiography is considered part of a broader body of Dalit women's testimonies that challenge mainstream narratives and provide alternative perspectives on Indian society, particularly regarding caste, gender, and social justice. It contributes to the assertion of marginalised identities and offers a voice to those historically silenced.

== See also ==
- Dalit literature
- Feminist literature
