= Janabai Kachru Girhe =

Indian writer and educator

- Born: c. 1958; Sangvi, Pathardi, Ahmednagar district, Maharashtra, India
- Occupations: Writer, educator
- Writing career
- Language: Marathi
- Genres: Autobiography, poetry, short story
- Notable work: Marankala (1992)
- Literary movement: Dalit literature

Janabai Kachru Girhe (born c. 1958) is an Indian writer, poet, and educator from Maharashtra. She is recognized as the first woman autobiographer from the nomadic Gopal community of Maharashtra. Her autobiography, Marankala (transl. Deathly Pains) published in 1992, is considered a significant work in Dalit literature for its portrayal of the struggles of a nomadic community and the challenges of women's education.

== Early life and education ==
Janabai Girhe was born in Sangvi village in Pathardi, Ahmednagar district, to Guzarabai and Bapurao Mali belonging to the Gopal community. The traditional nomadic style and superstitious beliefs of the community led to significant opposition to her education. She completed her schooling at Jain Mahavidyalaya in Pathardi in 1977 and went on to earn a Diploma in Education (D.Ed.).

== Career ==
Girhe began her career as a primary school teacher in 1977. She worked in various Zilla Parishad schools in Aurangabad district. In 2004, she was promoted to the position of headmistress, and she retired from this role in 2012.

Throughout her teaching career, she continued to write, documenting the unique experiences and hardships of her nomadic community.

=== Writing ===
Girhe's writing is noted for bringing a new perspective to Marathi literature, focusing on the life and culture of the Gopal community. Her autobiography, Marankala, published in 1992 is her most notable work. It details her personal and community's struggle for survival, dignity, and education. It is considered a key text within the canon of Dalit women's life narratives, alongside works by writers like Urmila Pawar and Kumud Pawde. Scholar Sharmila Rege analyzes the work in Writing Caste/Writing Gender, highlighting its importance in understanding the intersection of caste and gender from the perspective of a nomadic woman.

Girhe has also written Pahat Gani (2014), a collection of poetry; and Ughadyavarch Jagan (2014), a collection of short stories.

== Awards and recognition ==
Girhe has been honoured with several awards for her contributions to literature and society, including:

- Mukadam Sahitya Puraskar
- Ramai Puraskar, Aurangabad (2009)
- Adivasi Bhatke-Vimukta Gaurav Puraskar (2004)
- Vruttaratna Samrat Gaurav Puraskar (2014)

== Books ==
- Marankala. Aurangabad: Girhe Prakashan. (Marathi). 1992.

== See also ==
- Dalit literature
- Marathi literature
- Sharmila Rege
