= CIER =

CIER may refer to:

- Centre for International Education and Research
- Chung-Hua Institution for Economic Research, an institution in Taiwan
