= N. K. Jose =

Indian historian (1929–2024)

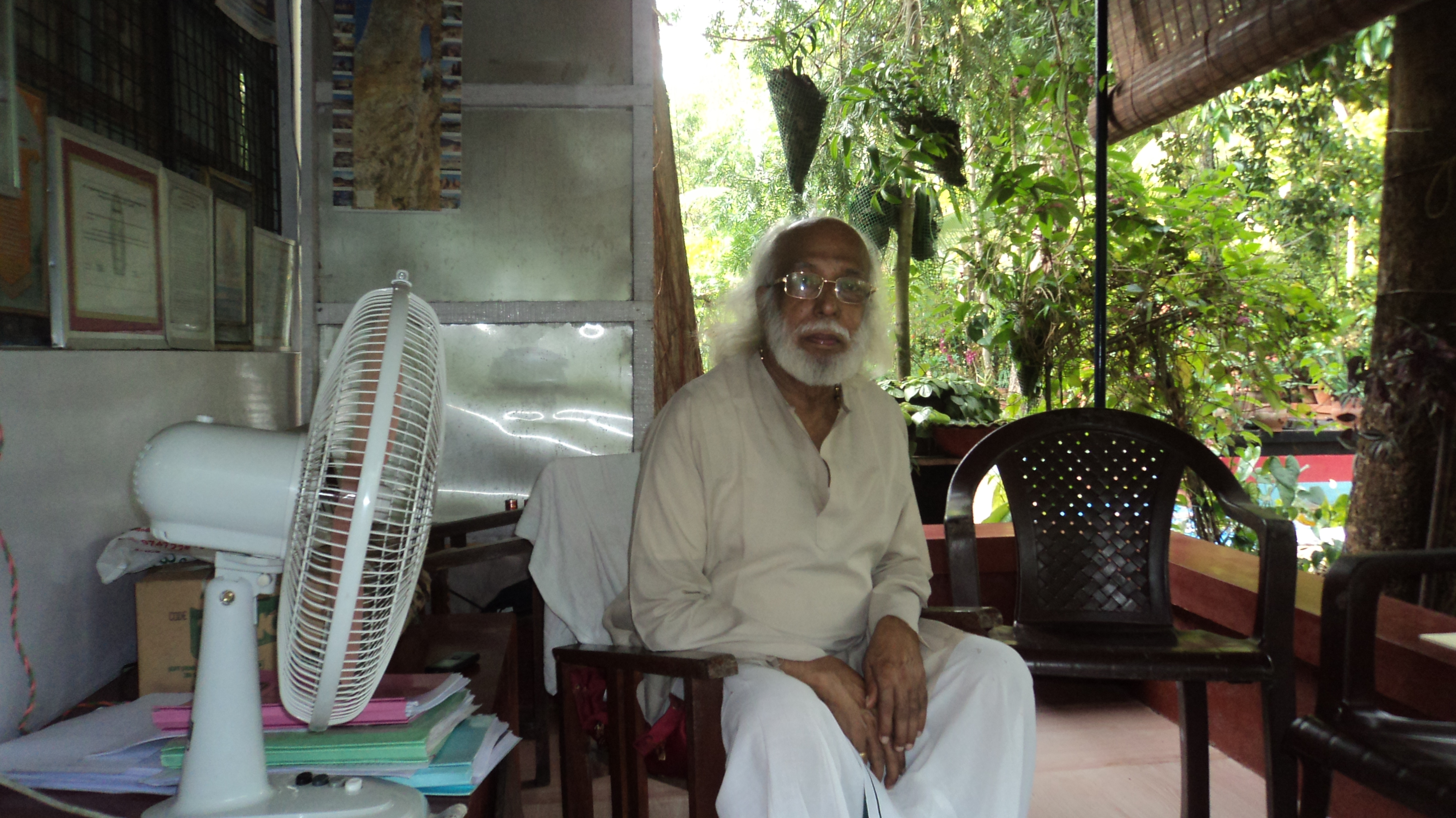
- Born: N. K. Jose; 2 February 1929; Vechoor, Travancore, British India
- Died: 5 March 2024 (aged 95); Vechoor or Vaikom, Kerala, India
- Education: B.A., History
- Alma mater: St. Alberts Ernakulam; Thevara Sacred Heart College; University of Madras
- Occupation: Historian
- Writing career
- Genres: History, Social history, Religious history, Dalit studies
- Notable awards: Kerala Sahitya Akademi Award for Overall Contributions

N. K. Jose [d͡ʒoːs] (2 February 1929 – 5 March 2024) was an Indian historian who was President of the Kerala History Congress known for his studies in Dalit and Christian history in Kerala. Author of over 140 history and social history books, he was given the title Dalit Bandhu by Dalit organizations in 1990 in recognition of his contributions to Dalit studies and Dalit history.

In 2019, for outstanding contributions in the field of Malayalam literature, he was awarded the Kerala Sahitya Akademi Award for Overall Contributions. Presenting the award, the then Chairman of the Kerala Sahitya Akademi, Vaisakhan, said that the contribution of N. K. Jose, a historian who shed light on the unknown history of Kerala, was unparallelled.

== Biography ==
N. K. Jose was born on 2 February 1929 in Vechoor, a village then in the Kingdom of Travancore, British India, now in Vaikom taluk, Kottayam district, Kerala, India to Kurien and Mariamma. He completed his primary education from Devi Vilasam School in Vechoor, NSS School in Ullala, Government Boys School in Cherthala and SB High School in Changanassery. In his memoirs, Jose writes about the Punnapra-Vayalar uprising that took place when he was a teenager. He was educated at Thevara Sacred Heart College and St. Albert's College Ernakulam. He earned his BA degree from the University of Madras.

During his studies, Jose became interested in communist socialist ideas. His contact with Vaikom Muhammad Basheer had a significant impact on his life. His first short story "Ente Premam" was written while studying in the fourth forum (now ninth class) at the Cherthala Government English School. At the age of 23, he wrote his first book, Muthalalitham Bharathathil (Capitalism in India). The period of his political writing was from 1952 to 1972. After completing his college education, he studied Gandhian thought and socialist studies at the Gandhi Ashram in Wardha. Later in his life, Jose strongly criticized Mahatma Gandhi. Jose's political gurus were socialist leaders like Ram Manohar Lohia, Vinoba Bhave and Jayaprakash Narayan. He even served as secretary to Jayaprakash Narayan. He switched from the socialist wing in the Congress Party to the Socialist Party of India and later to the Praja Socialist Party (PSP). When he was the state office bearer of the PSP, the party was in the ruling front in Travancore, a police shooting in Marthandam led to an all-India split in the PSP and because of this Jose quit active politics.

Jose held several state-level positions in the Kerala Catholic Congress during the 1960s. Then he read B. R. Ambedkar's biography, and realized that what he was looking for was Ambedkarism. He left Catholicism in 1983 and became a full-time Dalit history researcher. Jose's works were a breakdown of traditional history and perceptions that had been held for generations. His main books are classified into two series: the Nasrani series (books on Christian history) and the Dalit series (books on Dalit history).

On 24 September 1990, at a conference of Dalit organizations in Kottayam, Jose was honoured with the title of 'Dalit Bandhu' in honour of his contributions to Dalit studies. Thereafter he adopted it as his pen name.

Jose resided at his house Namasivayam in Ambika market, Vaikom.

== Contributions ==
Jose made many discoveries in the history of Kerala that refuted misconceptions that had existed till then. He published books about the Buddhist history of Kerala, which was covered by the dominant Hindu consensus in Kerala. In the Padmanabhaswami temple property controversy, arguments on the Buddhist history of Kerala were put forward in a book written by him. He did the first major comprehensive study of the life history of Arattupuzha Velayudha Panicker. His book about the Channar revolt questioned some existing views on the struggle of Nadar women to cover their upper body. Another book discussed a poorly known massacre at a pond near Vaikom Temple. He wrote controversial books about Pazhassi Raja and Christian history in Kerala.

Jose openly said that the belief that Kerala Christians were converts from Brahmins was a figment of the imagination of church leaders. It was found that Brahmanism has only half the age of Christianity in Kerala. He also rejected the new idea that the origin of Christians was not from the Brahmins, but from the Jews of ancient Kerala. Jose argued that the early Christians in Kerala were the Adivasi of the country and that the transformation took place at a time when the caste system did not exist. Jose said that in recent times, Dalits and other vulnerable groups had converted to Christianity to get rid of the caste system. Jose repeatedly said that the Buddhist, Jain and Dalit traditions, culture and history of the area were systematically ignored.

Jose also made significant observations about Shaivism, which is widely popular in India. He suggests that Shivalinga worship was performed by the primitive inhabitants of the Indus Valley to please the Mother Gods. He said that the Dravidians, who came from that culture, installed the Shivalinga wherever they settled, and later the Brahmins took it over as an icon of worship.

== Personal life and death ==
In 1955, he married Thankamma. The couple had no children.

Dalit Bandhu N. K. Jose died on 5 March 2024, at the age of 95.

== Works ==
=== Some books in the Dalit series ===
- Channar lahala (book on the Channar revolt)
- Pulaya lahala (book on the Pulaya revolt)
- Kshetrapraveshana vilambaram (book on the Temple Entry Proclamation)
- Vaikom Satyagraha oru prahelika (Vaikom Satyagraha is an Enigma)
- Shipayi lahala oru dalit munnettam (Sipoy Revolts are a Dalit Movement)
- Veluthampi Dalava (book on the life of Velu Thampi Dalawa)
- Diwan Monroe (book on the life of Diwan Monroe)
- Ambedkar (book on the life of B. R. Ambedkar)
- Mahanaya Ayyankali (book on the life of Ayyankali)
- Vaikuntha Swamikal (book on the life of Ayya Vaikundar)
- Jyotirao Phule (book on the life of Jyotirao Phule)
- Kerala Parashurama Pulaya shathru (Kerala Parashurama is the Enemy of Pulaya)
- Kraisthava dalithar (book on Dalit Christians)
- Ambedkarum Manusmritiyum (Ambedkar and Manusmriti)
- Gandhi Gandhism Dalitar (book on Mahatma Gandhi, Gandhism and Dalits)
- Gandhi vadham oru punarvayana (A re-reading of the Assassination of Mahatma Gandhi)
- Valmiki oru baudhano (Is Valmiki a Buddhist?)
- Karutha America (Black America)
- Karutha Keralam (Black Kerala)

=== Some books in the Nasrani series ===
- Adima Kerala kraisthavarute aradhana bhasha (book on the worship language of early Kerala Christians)
- Arnos pathiri (book on the life of the priest Arnos Pathiri)
- Knayithomman oru sathyamo?
- Keralathile katholica armayar (book on the Catholic laity in Kerala)
- Bharathathile kristhumatham (book on Christianity in India)
- Keralathile suriyani sabhayute uthbhavam (book on the origin of the Syrian Church in Kerala)
- Mar Thoma Roccas (book on the life of Mar Thoma Roccas)
- Jathikku karthavyan Geevarghese
- History of Syro Malabar Qurbana
- Siro malabar kurbanayute charithram (book on the origin of the Syrian Church in Kerala)
- Kaldaya paithrukam (book on the East Syriac Rite)
- Kudavachoor palli (book on the history of Kudavachoor Church)
- Knanaya (book on the history of the Knanaya)
- Nasrani (Christian)
- Adima kerala sabha (Primitive Kerala Church)
- Nilaykkal

=== Political books ===
- Muthalalitham Bharathathil (Capitalism in India)
- Congress Pathanam Ottanottathil (Fall of Congress at a Glance)
- Praja Socialist Partyude Udayam (Rise of Praja Socialist Party)
- Kerala Prashnam (Kerala Problem)
- Indian Socialism

=== Others ===
- Sree Padmanabhaswami Kshetranidhi Arudeth? (Whose Is the Treasure of Sri Padmanabhaswamy Temple?)

== Awards and honours ==
- Kerala Sahitya Akademi Award for Overall Contributions 2019

== Legacy ==
In 2023, Sree Sankaracharya University of Sanskrit Vice-Chancellor Prof. M.V. Narayanan announced that an archive will be started in the name of Dalit Bandhu N. K. Jose at the university's Kalady main campus. The archive, said to be prepared under the supervision of the history department of the university, will collect and preserve Dalit Bandhu's manuscripts, letters and rare books from his personal collection. He also announced that the university will organize annual lecture every year in the name of Dalit Bandhu N. K. Jose.
