= Deshkal Society =

Deshkal Society (देशकाल सोसाइटी) is an Indian non-governmental organisation (NGO). It works to realise a vision of socially and economically inclusive growth and to ensure dignity, equality and justice for all. The NGO has focused on the Dalits of Bihar, including working on the education of their children, land ownership rights and problems of employment.

Started in 1995 by teachers, journalists and young researchers, it was initially aimed at bringing out a Hindi magazine focused on liberal and logical thinking.

This NGO has worked with UNICEF Bihar, NITI Aayog, MHRD, Ford Foundation, IGNCA, and Nalanda University.

== History ==
In 1995, Deshkal India was started as a Hindi magazine. Initially, it aimed to expand a liberal and thoughtful society. The founder of this society is Sanjay Kumar, a scholar and practitioner who shaped this society to work for the social diversity, inequality, and education for all.

This society has worked for rights of marginal sections, education for all and inequality. Under Dr Sanjay Kumar, this society had worked for educational framework of children from Dalit community (2002–2005) with the aid from MHRD, Govt of India. It also worked with UNICEF in Bihar (2015–2016). A report from this society, which received assistance from the NITI Aayog, in 2014 suggested modifying the Bihar Privileged Persons Homestead Tenancy Act 1947 to establish a sustainable and egalitarian housing policy.

== Works ==
=== Homestead rights ===
This has worked for access to land and secure ownership rights over it for the marginalised community in the Gaya region of Bihar. In this regard, they filed 2,492 applications that included 425 applications for raiyati land, 1,536 for ghairmazarua khas land (common land for special use), and 531 for ghairmazarua aam land (common land for general use).

=== Inclusive education ===
Deshkal Society support inclusive education in Bihar by raising the academic attainment and school attendance rates of kids from rural areas. They work for the efficacy of schools by implementing inclusive teaching and learning methodologies. By facilitating children from marginalised communities' enrolment, retention, and involvement and attending to their various needs, they contribute to their social inclusion.

=== Dalit Studies ===
Deshkal Society pushed the idea of 'Dalit Studies' in the Indian university education system. It underlined "how unaware the general public is of Dalit culture and living circumstances. Different subject curricula fail to address issues that stem from Dalit people's unique historical experiences". In this course, the Ford Foundation helped them to create a forum where the discussion related to a new need for content material, nature, scope and method related to Dalit culture and studies.

=== Bodh Gaya Global Dialogue ===
"Bodh Gaya Global Dialogues" is an event organised by the Deshkal Society regularly. The global dialogues cover a mosaic of parallel sub-events, including plenary sessions, panel discussions, children's programs, cultural events, film shows, award functions, book launches, and heritage walks, to bring the many themes of sustainable development, rich history, culture, and heritage of the place into the public discussion.

== Publications ==
- The Social Context of Learning in India Achievement Gaps and Factors of Poor Learning, 2023; Routledge(London), ISBN 9781032646091.
- Marginalized Self: Tales of resistance of a Community, 2020; Primus Books, ISBN 978-9389933802.
- Dynamics of Inclusive Classroom: Social Diversity, Inequality and School Education in India, 2017; Orient Black Swan, ISBN 9789352870134.
- School Education, Pluralism and Marginality, 2012; Orient Black Swan, ISBN 9788125045311.
- Interrogating Development: Insights from the Margins, 2010; Oxford University Press, ISBN 9780198066415.

=== Deshkal publication ===
Deshkal has its own publication unit from which dozens of books related to social and cultural issues have been published. It has also published several maps of Dum Dum, a locality of Kolkata which has been acknowledged in media reports.

- Dalit Studies in Higher Education Vision and Challenges, 2005; Deshkal Publication, ISBN 81-902865-0-1.
- Asserting Voices Changing Culture, Identity and Livelihood of the Musahars in the Gangetic Plains, 2002; Deshkal Publication, ISBN 81-902865-0-1.

== See also ==
- Dalit studies
- Musahar
