= Nicolas Jaoul =

French anthropologist

- Born: France
- Known for: Dalit studies in India
- Scientific career
- Fields: Anthropology
- Workplaces: French National Centre for Scientific Research

Nicolas Jaoul is a French anthropologist and documentary film maker. He is a researcher in Anthropology at CNRS, National Centre for Scientific Research, Paris. His areas of interest are political anthropology of Dalit emancipation. He did his PhD research in the state of Uttar Pradesh in India. He released his documentary film Sangharsh - Times of Strife based on dalit struggle in Kanpur between 1997 and 2001.

== See also ==
- Dalit studies
- Christophe Jaffrelot
- Gail Omvedt
