= St. Mary's Church, Vechoor =

Church in Vechoor, Kerala, India

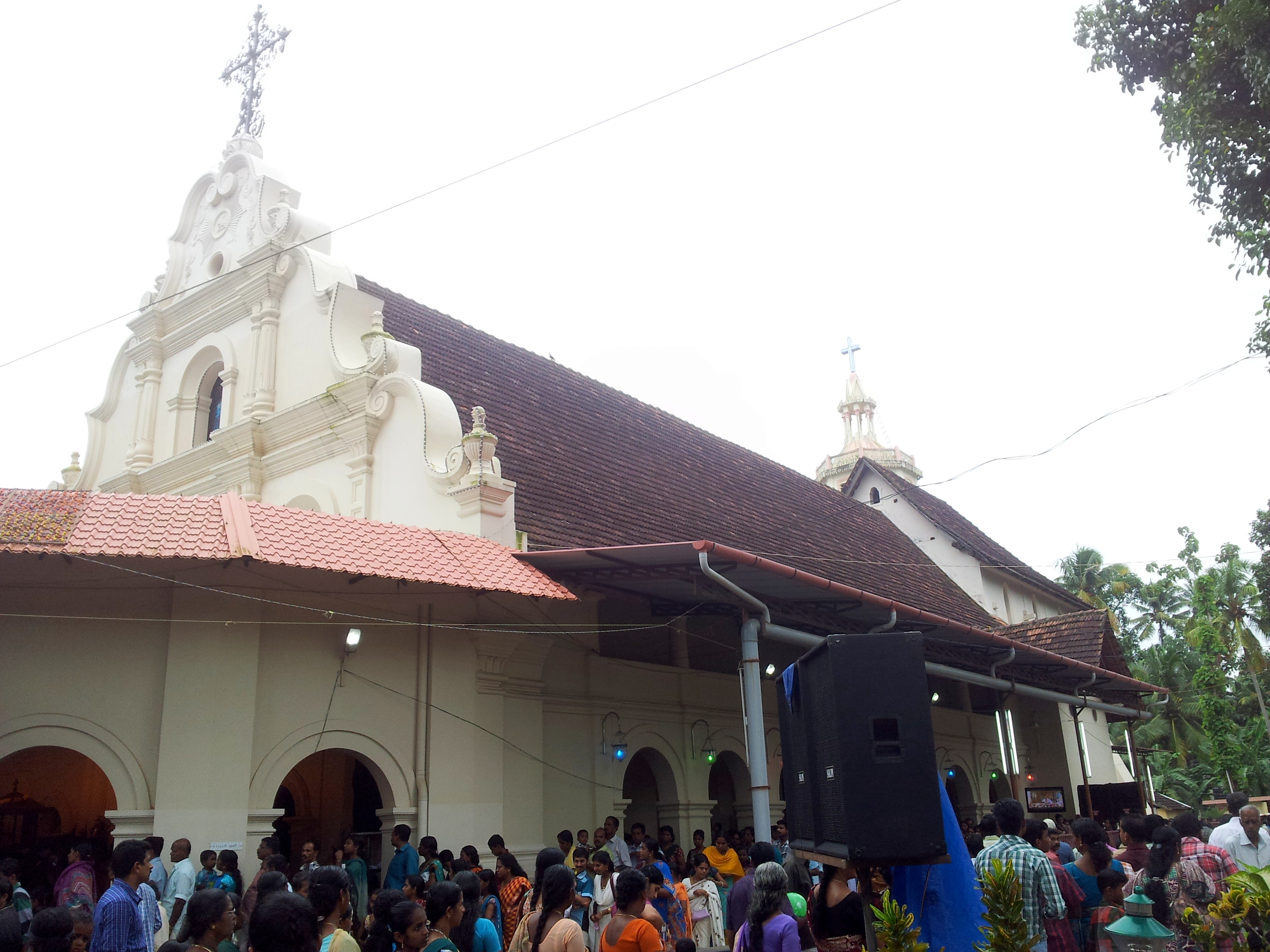

St. Mary's Church is a church in Vechoor, that was consecrated in 1463. It stands on the Eastern bank of Vembanad Lake. It belongs to the Syro-Malabar Catholic Major Archeparchy of Ernakulam-Angamaly. It is a centre of pilgrimage because the Church has a painted image of St. Mary believed to be a true copy of St. Luke's portrait of Mary. The image is believed to have the power to make miracles.
