= Vechoor =

Vechoor Kuda Vechoor
- village
- Interactive map of Vechoor
- Coordinates: 9°40′0″N 76°25′0″E
- Country: India
- State: Kerala
- District: Kottayam

Population (2011)
  - Total: 17,041

Languages
  - Official: Malayalam, English
- Time zone: UTC+5:30 (IST)
- Postal code: 686144
- Vehicle registration: KL-
- Nearest city: Vaikom
- Lok Sabha constituency: Kottayam
- Vidhan Sabha constituency: Vaikom

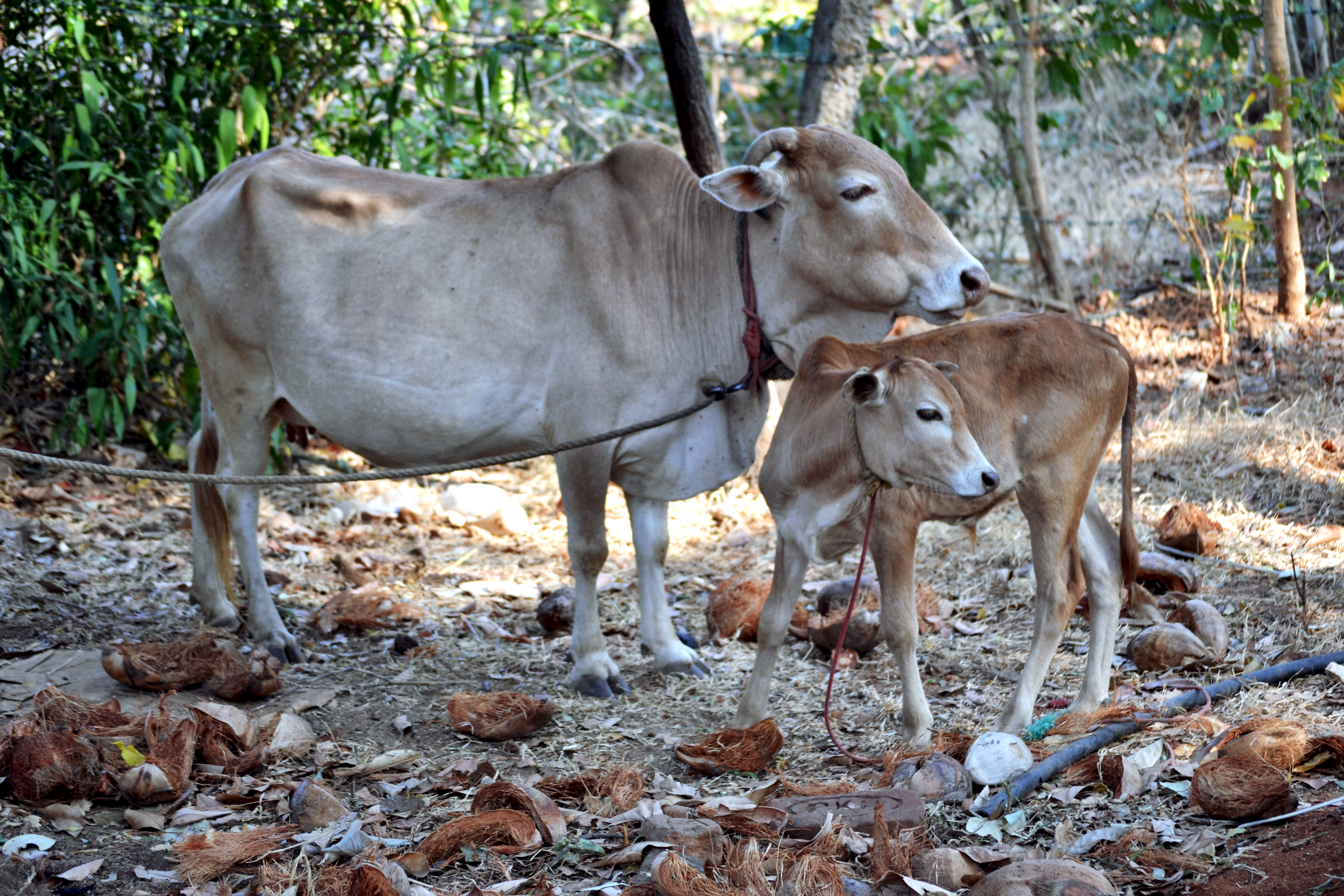
Vechoor Cow

Vechoor is a village in Vaikom taluk, Kottayam district in the state of Kerala, India. Vechoor is a short drive away from one of Kerala's tourist destinations, Kumarakom. The Vechur Cow breed of cattle is named after this village.

== Geography ==
Vechoor village covers a total area of 2,913 hectares. Vechoor is bordered by Vembanattu lake on the west and Kaipuzha river on south. Thanneermukkom Bund starts from Vechoor. The eastern part of Vechoor is majorly covered by paddy fields. There are many natural and man made canals in Vechoor which were used for water transport and irrigation.

== Transport links ==
Until 1985, road connectivity to Vechoor was limited and bus services from Vaikom. A road bridge alongside Thanneermukkom Bund connected Vechoor to Alleppey district in 1985. In 2003, Vechoor got connected directly to Kottayam via Kumarakom. Renovation of Kallara - Vechoor road added further connectivity. Vechoor is about 10 km from both the towns Vaikom and Cherthala. Kottayam and Alappuzha are about 20 kilometres away. There are regular bus services to all the towns. Bundroad junction is a major junction in the village where Vaikom - Vechoor road meets the road to Cherthala. Kaippuzhamuttu is a bus hub where many bus services terminate.

A mega infrastructure road project is being planned through Vechoor connecting Cherthala to Manarcaud

== Water transport ==
Swamikkallu boat jetty on western coast of Vechoor used to have regular services connecting Ernakulam, Vaikom, Thanneermukkom, Mannanam and Kottayam. Also hand rowed boats were regularly used for transport of goods till end of the 20th century. However the improvement of road transport reduced the importance of inland water transport. The boat jetty is now a hub for tourist houseboats.

== Railway station ==
The nearest railway station is Cherthala on the Ernakulam-Kayamkulam coastal line which is 12 kilometers away. Cochin International Airport is 70 km away.

== Education institutions ==
- Government Devivilasam Higher secondary school
- St. Michael's Higher secondary school
- Govt. Highschool Vechoor (known as Perumana school)
- St. Mary's Lower Primary School
- St George Lower Primary School
- Hindi Premi Mandal of Dakshin Bharath Hindi Prachar Sabha (closed down)

N.S.S High school Vechoor is not located in Vechoor despite the name.

== Religious institutions ==
- Govindhapuram Sreekrishna Swami temple
- Sasthakkulam Devi Temple
- Poonkavu Devi Temple
- St. Mary's Church
- Ansarul Islam Juma Masjid Achinakom
- Cherakulangara Devi Temple
- Idayazham Subramanya Swami Temple
- Muchoorkkavu Temple
- Vaikundapuram Sreekrishna Temple

== Notable personalities ==
- Harikrishnan, Malayalam film actor
- C. K. Asha, Member of Kerala Legislative Assembly
- Dalit Bandhu N. K. Jose: Historian known for his studies in Dalit and Christian history.

== Demographics ==
As per 2011 census, Vechoor had a population of 17041 with 8,315 males and 8,726 females. In 2001, Vechoor had a population of 16,830 with 8,305 males and 8,525 females. After 2010, several migrant workers arrived in Vechoor particularly from West Bengal and Bihar.
