= Thanneermukkom Bund =

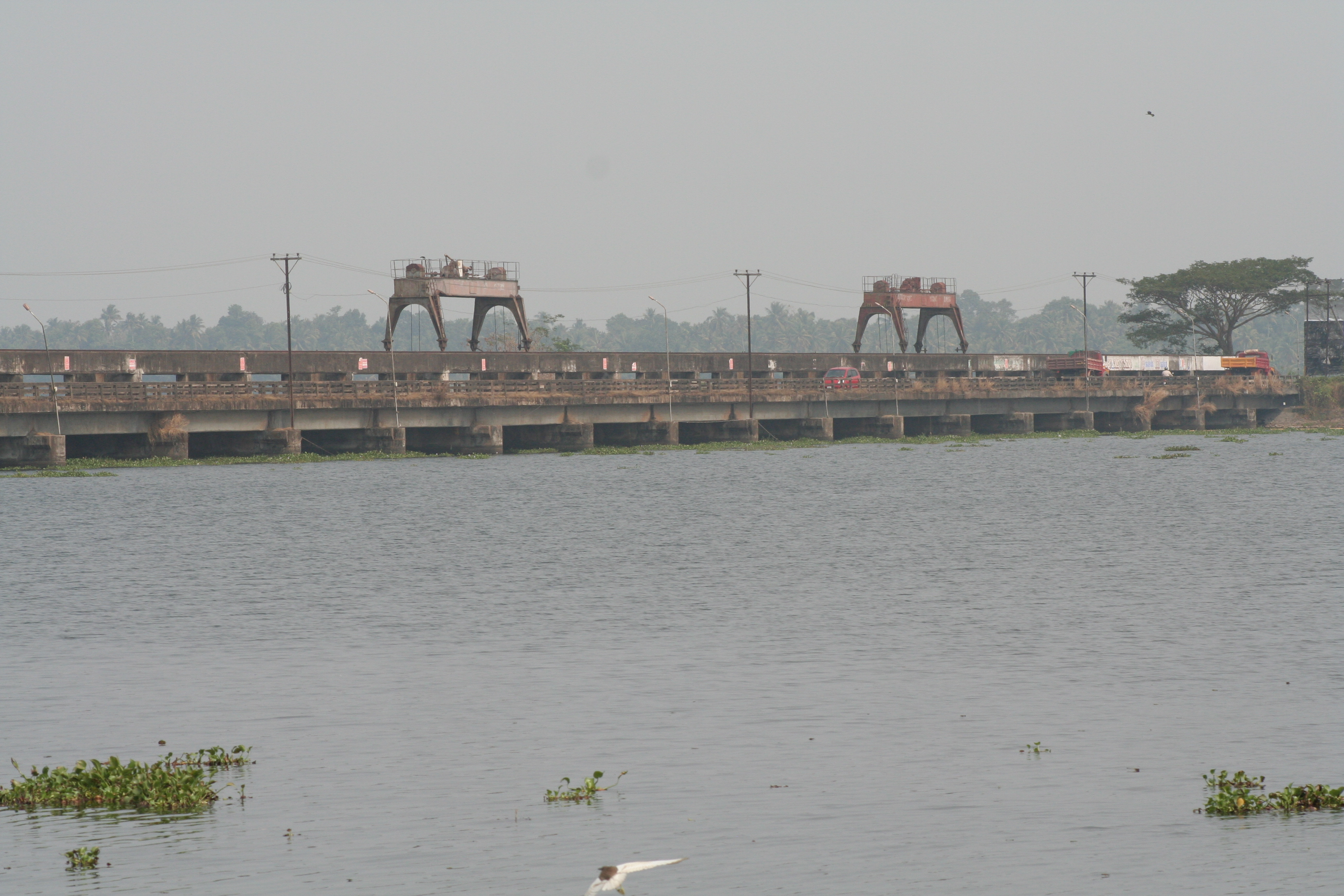
- View of the Thanneermukkom Bund from the south west adjacent to the lake

- Location within India Location within Kerala
- Country: India
- Location: Kuttanad, Kerala
- Coordinates: 9.675°N 76.398°E

The Thanneermukkom Bund (Thannermukkom Salt Water Barrier) was constructed as a part of the Kuttanad Development Scheme to prevent tidal action and intrusion of salt water into the Kuttanad low-lands across Vembanad Lake between Thannermukkom on west and Vechur on east. Thanneermukkom Bund was constructed in 1974 and is functional since 1976. It is the largest mud regulator in India. This barrier essentially divides the lake into two parts - one with brackish water perennially and the other half with fresh water fed by the rivers draining into the lake.

== Geography ==
The bund is in Kuttanad, Kerala, India, located at 9°40′21″N 76°23′49″E. The barrier has divided the Vembanad lake into two parts converting the upstream part in to a fresh water coastal reservoir. It is presently the only one coastal reservoir in India.

== Location ==
It has been built across Lake Vembanad. It connects Vechoor of Vaikom taluk of Kottayam district and Thanneermukkom of Cherthala taluk Alappuzha district. It can be reached by road, from Kottayam town, Alappuzha or Cherthala. Frequent bus services are available from all the places mentioned.

== Environmental Impact ==
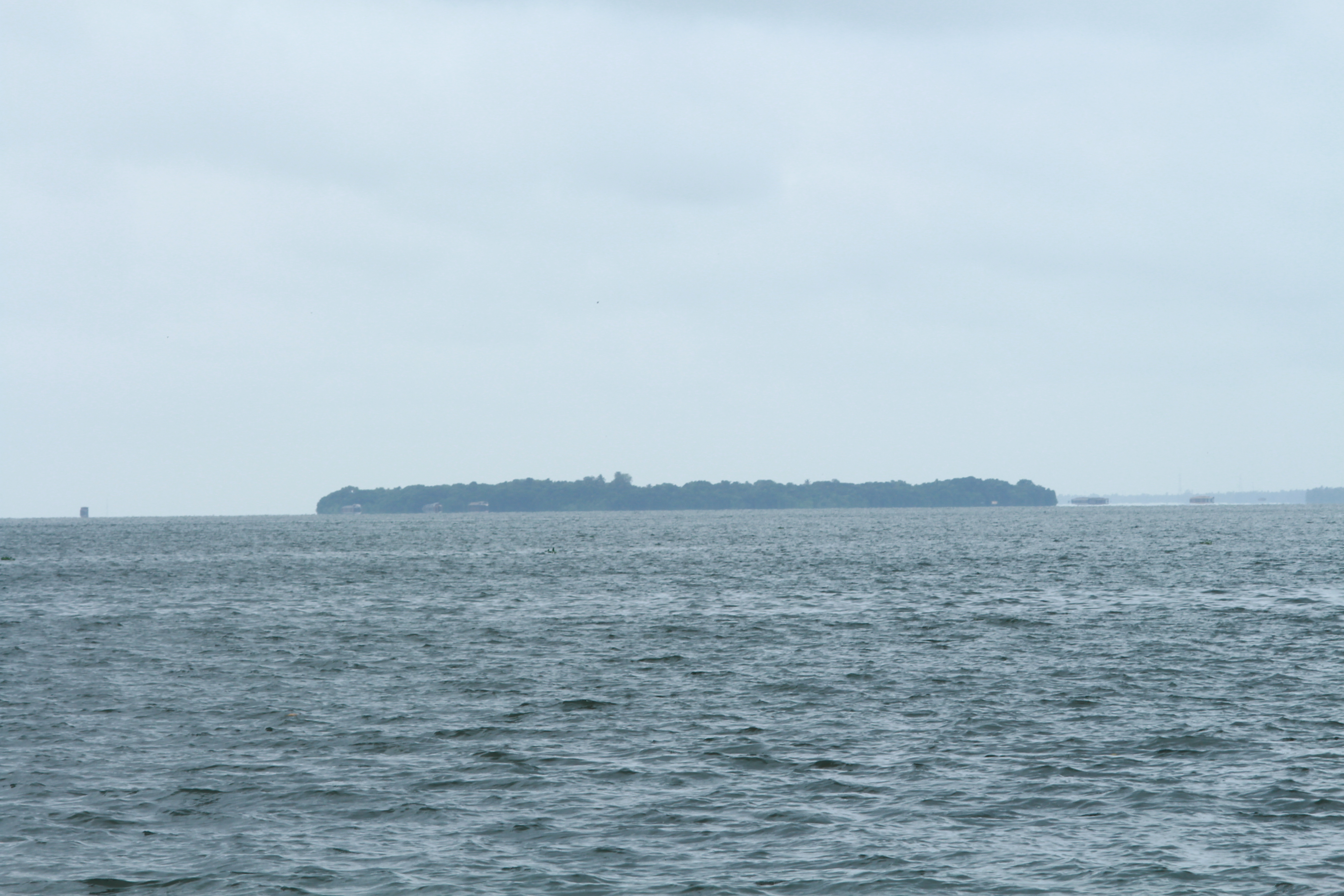
View of Pathiramanal Island from Thanneermukkom Bund

This barrier has helped the farmers in Kuttanad - where farming occurs below sea level. It has however also created ecological problems, primarily, the rampant propagation of the Water Hyacinth in fresh water. The backwaters which were abundant with fish and part of the staple food of the people of the region require a small amount of salt water for their breeding. The salt water barrier has caused deterioration of the catch of fish in the region and the fishermen are opposed to the bund as of 2005.

The salt water barrier has also disrupted the harmony of the sea with the backwaters and has caused problems not foreseen before the salt water barrier like the omnipresence of the water weeds. Earlier the salt water tends to cleanse the backwaters but this does not happen any more leading to the pollution of the backwaters and the entire land nearby.

The shutters are opened during monsoon to pass the flood waters and are closed later for six months approximately.
