= Thanneermukkom =

- village
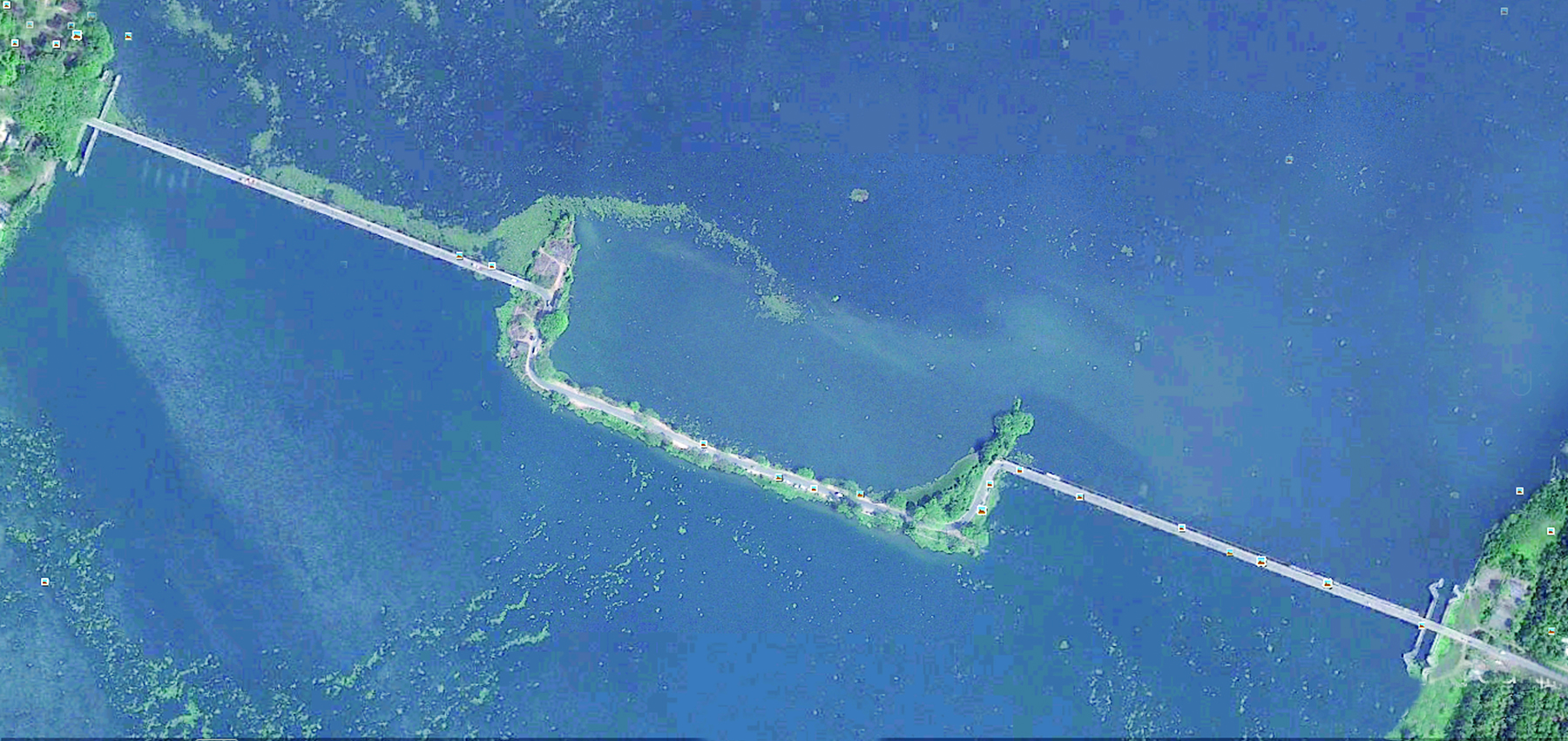
- Thanneermukkam Bund

- Location in Kerala, India Thanneermukkom (India)
- Coordinates: 9°38′24″N 76°21′35″E
- Country: India
- State: Kerala
- District: Alappuzha

Languages
  - Official: Malayalam, English
- Time zone: UTC+5:30 (IST)
- Telephone code: 0478
- Vehicle registration: KL-32
- Lok Sabha constituency: Alappuzha
- Vidhan Sabha constituency: Cherthala

Thanneermukkom is a village in Alappuzha district of Kerala, India.

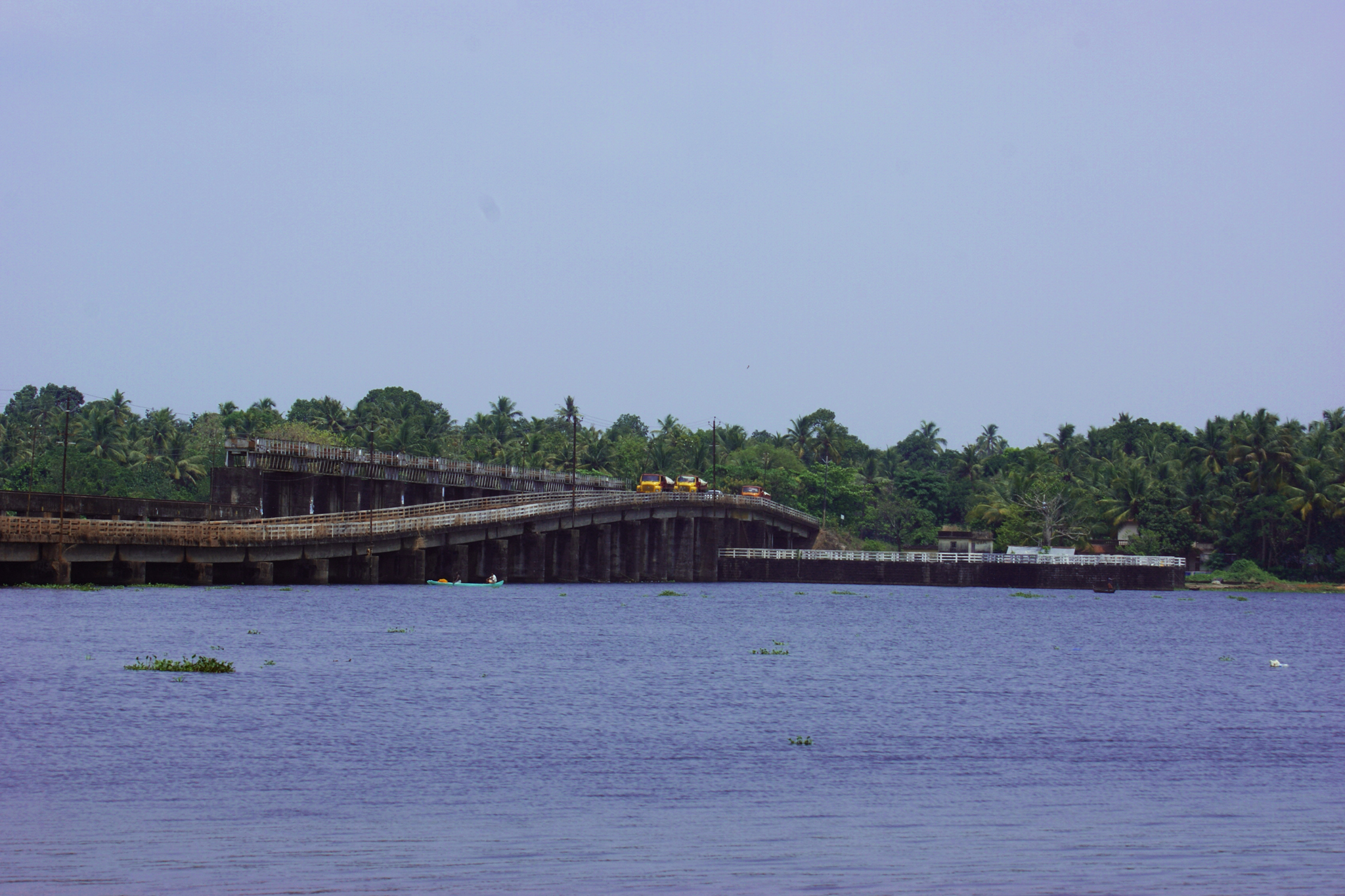
View of the Bund

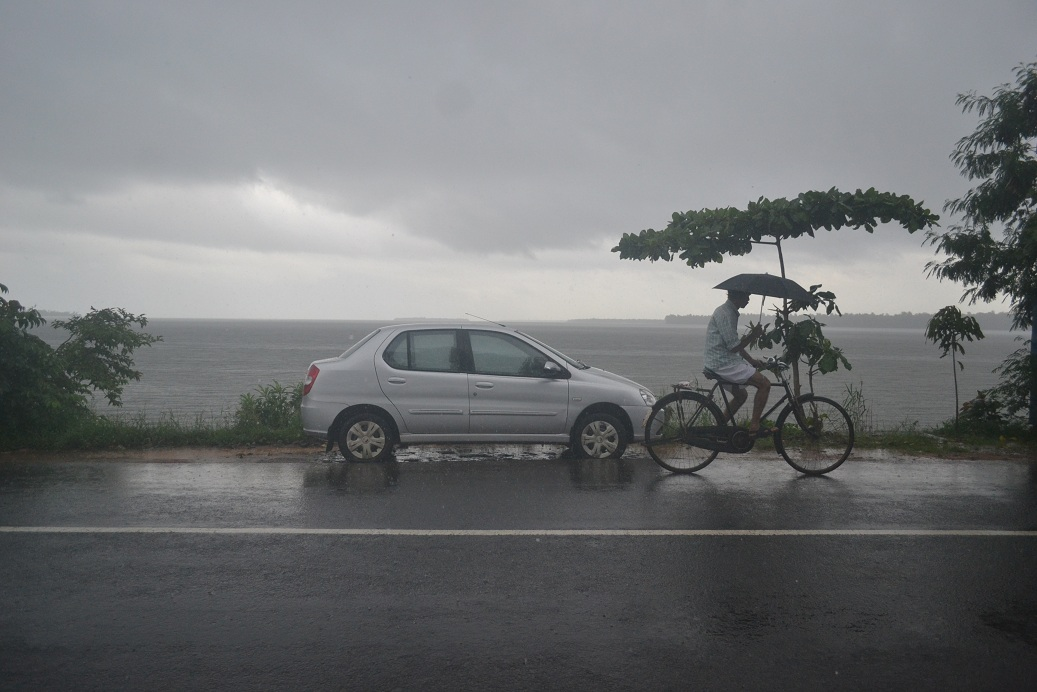
Rainy day at Thanneermukkam

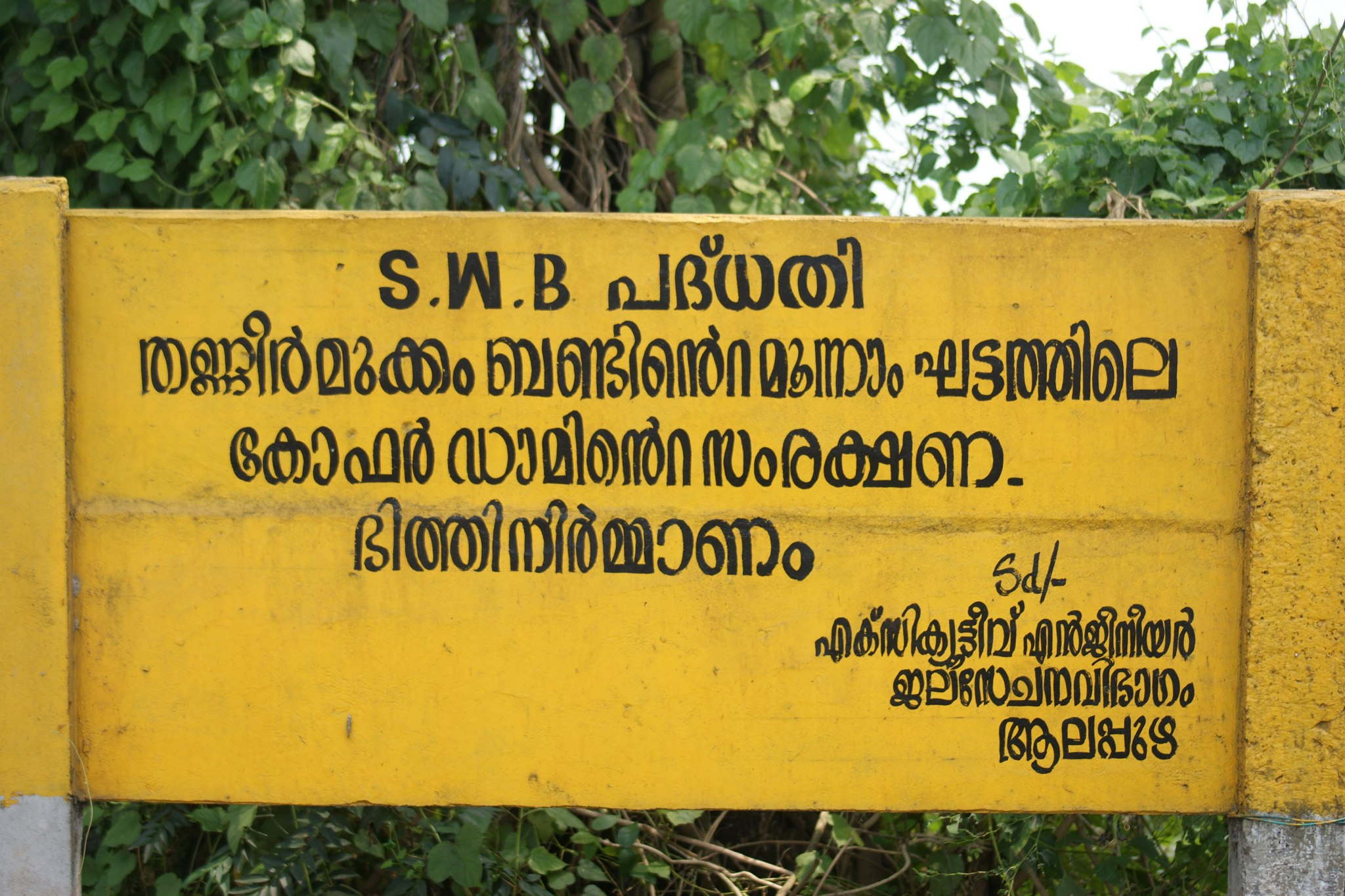
Bund project in the third stage

== Geography ==
It is located at 9°38′24″N 76°21′35″E. a beautiful place in alappuzha.

== Location ==
Thanneermukkom is on the banks of Lake Vembanad. There is a salt water barrier at Thanneermukkom, built across the lake, which connects it to Vechoor in Kottayam district. This barrier essentially divides the lake into two parts - one with brackish water perennially and the other half with fresh water fed by the rivers draining into the lake.

Bus services connect Thanneermukkom to Kottayam town, Alappuzha town and Cherthala. There are a few bus services to Ernakulam also.

== Environmental Impact of the Bund ==
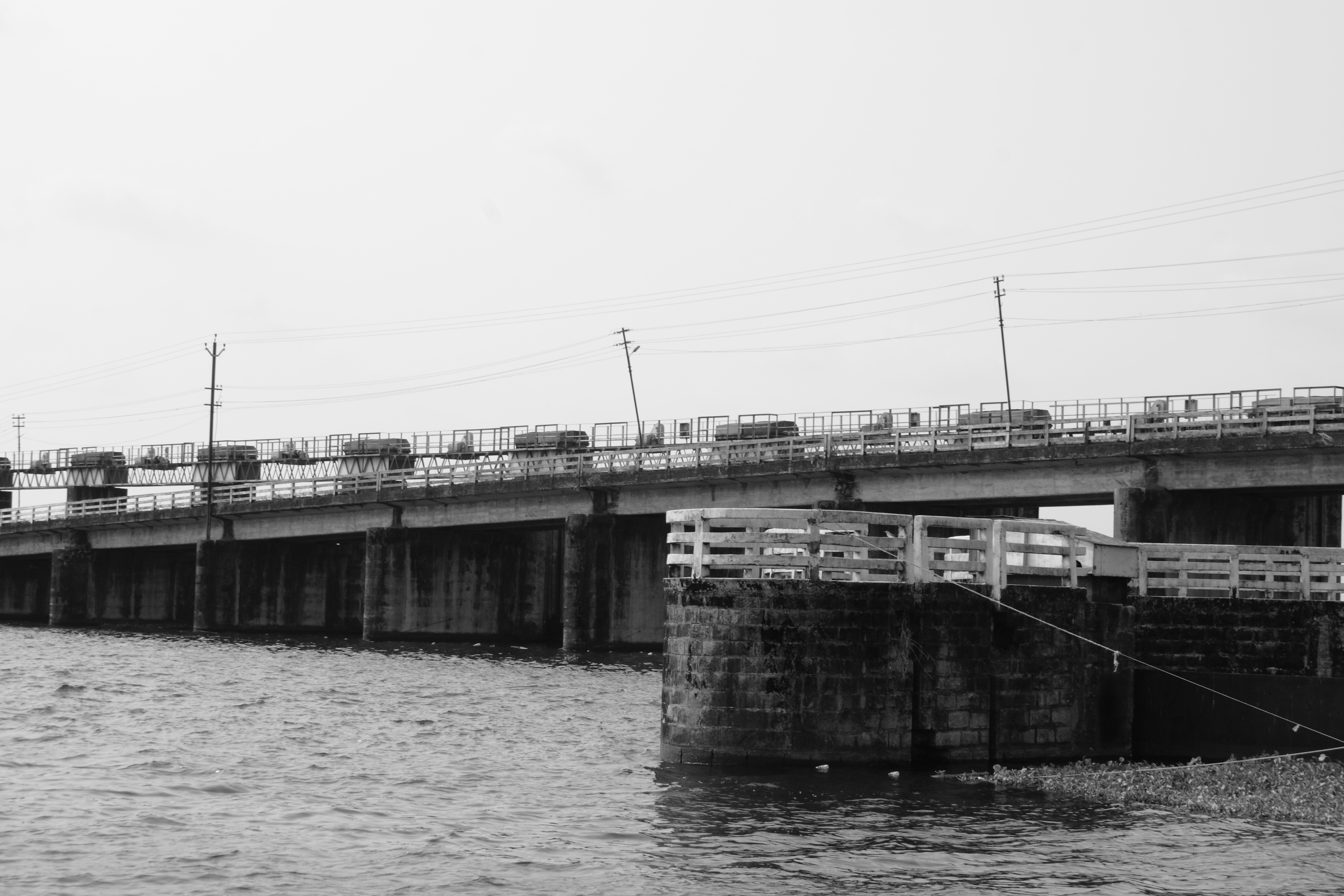
Thanneermukkom Bund a close look

This barrier has helped the farmers in Kuttanad - where farming is done below sea level. It has however also created ecological problems, primarily, the rampant propagation of the Water Hyacinth in fresh water. The backwaters which were abundant with fish and part of the staple food of the people of the region require a small amount of salt water for their breeding. The salt water barrier has caused deterioration of the catch of fish in the region and the fishermen are opposed to the bund as of 2005. The salt water barrier has also disrupted the harmony of the sea with the backwaters and has caused problems not foreseen before the salt water barrier like the omnipresence of the water weeds. Earlier the salt water tends to cleanse the backwaters but this does not happen any more leading to the pollution of the backwaters and the entire land nearby.

== Tourism ==
Thanneermukkom is an important destination in the backwater tourism map. A number of resorts dot the area.

== See also ==
- Thanneermukkom Bund
