= Coastal reservoir =

Place to store freshwater near seas

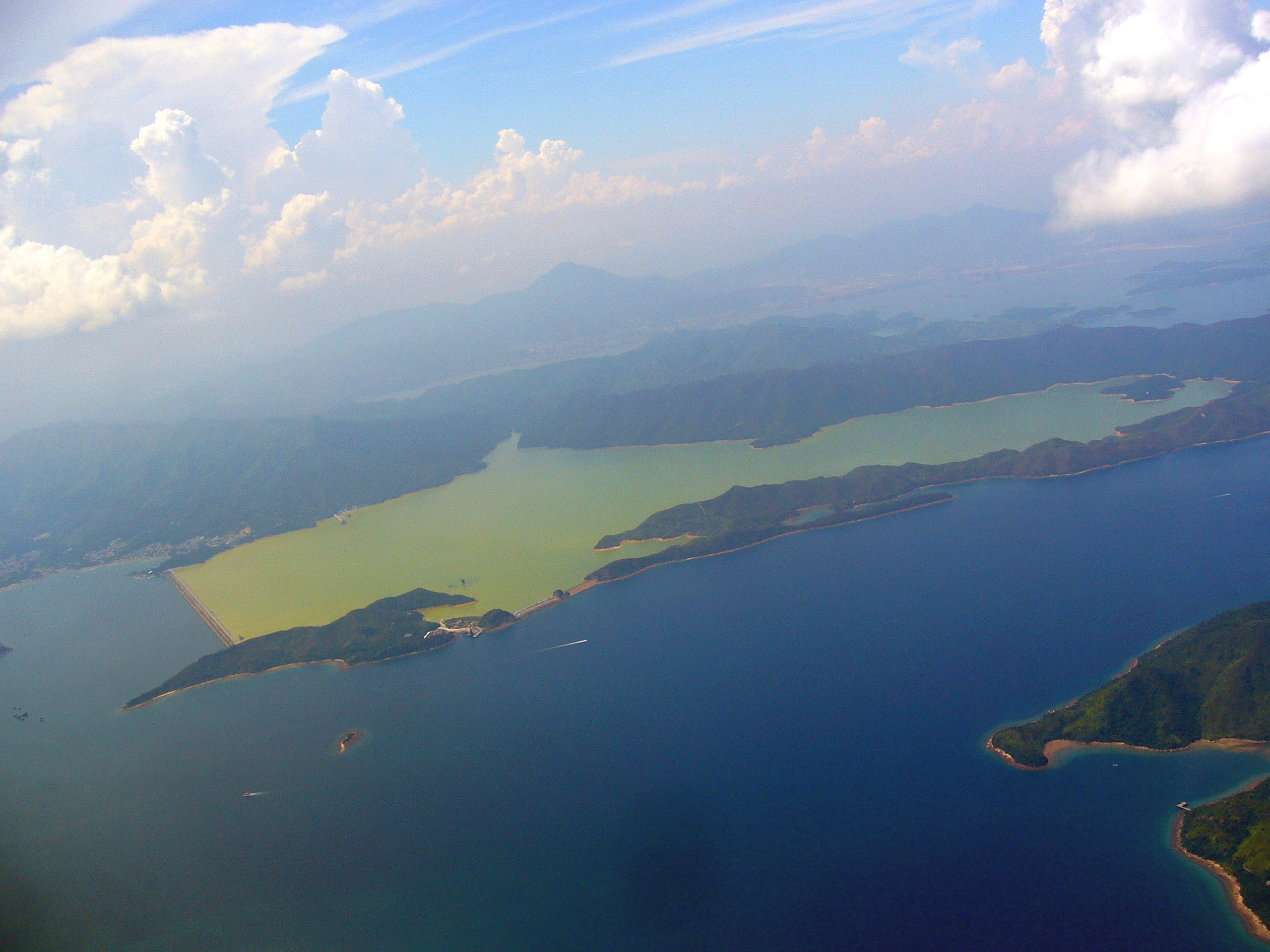
Aerial view of Plover Cove coastal reservoir

A Coastal reservoir is a type of reservoir to store fresh water in a dammed area of a coastal sea near a river delta. Saemanguem in South Korea, Marina Barrage in Singapore, Qingcaosha in China, Plover Cove in Hong Kong, Zuiderzee Works and Delta Works in the Netherlands, and Thanneermukkom Bund in India are a few existing coastal reservoirs.

== Advantages ==
Unlike land-based water reservoirs, there is no land submergence in the case of coastal reservoirs. They store water without disturbing land use by replacing standing salt water of the sea area by fresh water from a river. The coastal reservoir area is separated from the sea by building earth dikes, e.g. by dredging. Fresh water from these reservoirs can be used for irrigation, drinking water and industrial purposes. Sometimes the reservoirs are used for flood control and land reclamation. The social and environmental impacts of coastal reservoirs are often negligible compared to land-based water reservoirs. The construction costs are a few times less than the costs of land-based reservoirs since there is no expenditure for acquiring the vast land area, the submerged immovable properties and the rehabilitation of displaced people. The sea side of the coastal reservoir can also be used for locating a deep sea harbor.

== Climate change ==
A coastal reservoir project can also create adequate capacity Pumped-storage hydroelectricity potential to store the electricity generated by variable renewable energy sources and ensure adequate round-the-clock electricity supply. Due to irrigation, lands which are not available for cultivation and forestry can be turned into a habitat with copious greenery with enhanced carbon storage in the topsoil which would contribute in mitigating the global warming process. With the advent of cheap renewable energy like solar and wind power, the availability of energy sources is not an ongoing issue but water availability is still a major issue that can be solved by coastal reservoirs to a major extent.

== See also ==
- List of rivers by discharge
- List of largest unfragmented rivers
- Polavaram Project
- Pollution of the Ganges
- Water export
