= Centre for International Education and Research =

English research centre

Coordinates: 52.4515°N 1.9271°W

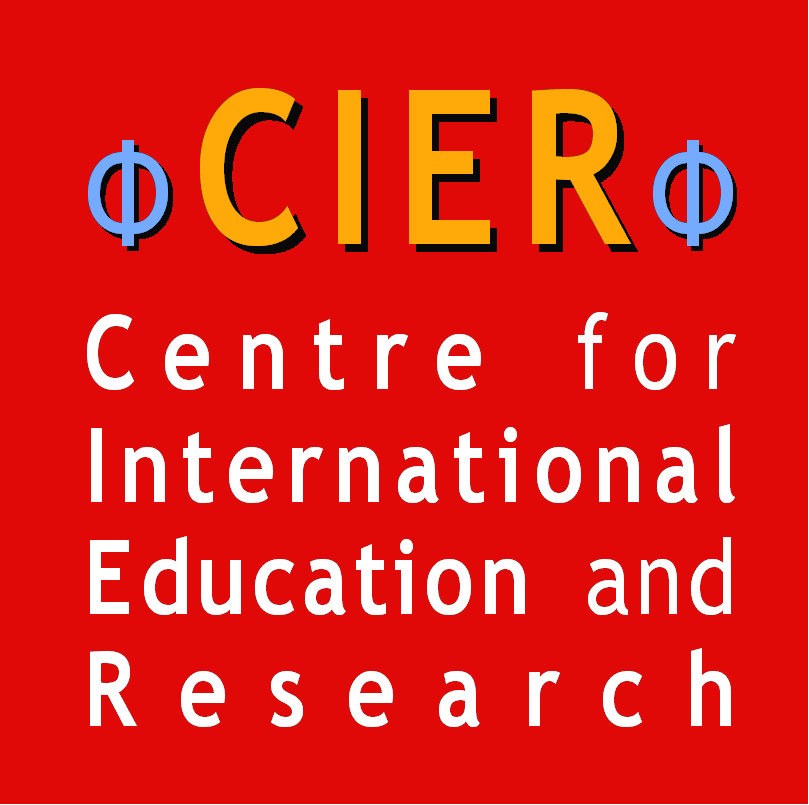
Educating for Global Justice

The Centre for International Education and Research (CIER) evolved in the 1950s, at the University of Birmingham UK, in the context of the involvement of British academics in the new international educational role of the United Nations.

Within the philosophy of Global justice, research and teaching interests at CIER include: human security, extremism, conflict and emergencies, sustainable development and environmental justice; global citizenship, human rights, and democracy; marginalisation, street children, inclusion and special educational needs (SEN); international development, and university internationalisation. The Centre runs an 'International Studies in Education' programme, at Masters and PhD levels, reflecting the fields of International education and Comparative education, and the work of international organisations such as UNESCO and UNICEF.

The Centre has worked with academics and students from most parts of the world, including Africa, South and East Asia, Europe, Middle East, and North and South America. Staff have carried out international research for academic and other organisations including the British Academy, British Council, Carnegie Foundation, CfBT, Council for Canadian Studies, Daiwa Angro Japanese Foundation, Department for International Development UK (DFID), Deutsche Bank, Economic and Social Research Council (ESRC), Esmée Fairbairn Foundation, European Commission, GTZ, Gulbenkian Foundation, Home Office, Japan Foundation, Joseph Rowntree Foundation, Oxfam, Sino-British Fellowship Trust, United States Department of Labor (USDoL), United Nations University (UNU), UNESCO and UNICEF.

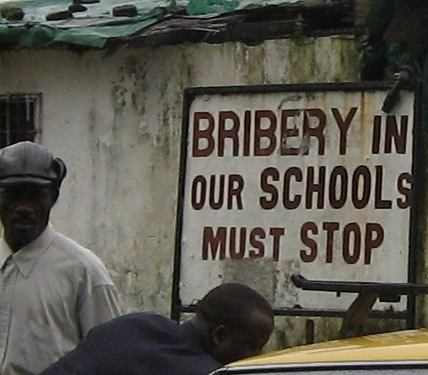
Anti-corruption poster, Liberia, 2004

CIER is a member of the UNESCO Associated Schools Network, and Development Education Association. It helped to set up the British University in Dubai (BUID), and has formal links with Ontario Institute of Education (OISE), University of Toronto; Deshkal Society, Delhi; the Gambia Youth Movement for Peace and Unity in Africa; and the UNESCO Asia-Pacific Centre of Education for International Understanding (APCEIU) in Seoul.

== History ==
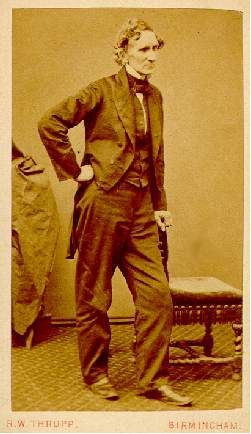
Elihu Burritt, the "grandfather of the United Nations", in Birmingham, circa 1860

Early international influences in Birmingham include Elihu Burritt, a US Consul sent by Abraham Lincoln, who lived in Harborne just north of the present Birmingham University campus. Known as the 'learned blacksmith', Burritt educated himself and became an exceptional linguist and social activist, working against slavery and famine, and for peace and industrial workers rights. In 1847 he created precursors to the League of Nations and United Nations – the League of Universal Brotherhood, and an International Peace Congress in Brussels (1848) and Paris (1849). He proposed a 'Congress of Nations' and a 'High Court of Nations', and was an instigator of peace education. He advocated free universal education, and in a 'Speech at the Anniversary of the Parish Schools, Harborne' concluded, "The pursuit of knowledge is not a steeple-chase...stimulated by the ambition to excel, and carry off the largest number of prizes and certificates of merit. It is the acquiring of the working capital of a useful life when the learner comes to act for himself or for others".

The ethos of Burritt's work continued when, after World War I, Birmingham University staff collaborated with the Workers' Educational Association (WEA) and League of Nations Union in Harborne, to teach local factory workers. In 1947, the International Student Service and Refugee Committee worked with the British Council to bring to the University eighty-three students from sixteen countries.

In 1952, Educational Review, the journal of the Birmingham University Institute of Education, ran a summer school at Malvern. Speaking in the era of a post-war world, and the formation of the United Nations, the Institute's director, Professor M.V.C. Jeffreys, observed, "The fate of our civilisation hangs in the balance. It is an age of conflict and confusion, both material and spiritual." At Malvern, "a group of men and women whose main purpose was a comparative study of education" met. The result was a report, 'Education in other countries'.

This initiative was followed by a series of country studies, including a description of 'Education in India' by B.C.L. James who was a Lecturer in Education at Birmingham University. James concluded, 'If every citizen is to exercise his [sic] legal rights in an atmosphere of goodwill, the teacher must be in a position to give his pupils a full understanding of his country's democracy', which was prescient of CIER's subsequent work on democracy, citizenship and global justice. A report about 'Education for International understanding', appeared in 1954, and inspired the UNESCO Recommendation of 1974. This Recommendation provides the basis for the UNESCO Asia-Pacific Centre of Education for International Understanding (APCEIU), which is formally linked with CIER.

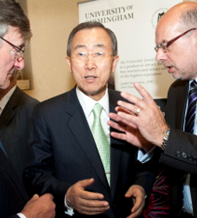
Ban Ki-moon, Secretary General of the United Nations, at Birmingham University, June 2009

In the 1960s, international work became located within the Unit for Commonwealth and Development Studies in Education, under the direction of Robert Dalton and then Rex Oram, which provided a 'Commonwealth Course' for ministry officials and head teachers. Dalton wrote, Education on the move: a handbook for teachers and administrators in the British tropical commonwealth, in 1968, and the Unit hosted the Annual Conference of the Association of Teachers of Overseas Education (ATOE) in 1984, with Philip Coombs as keynote speaker. While collaborating with the British Council, the Centre became known as the International Unit, and Peter Willig, who had taught in China soon after the Cultural Revolution, established a Comparative education course. In 1992, Roy Lowe, a Reader in the Education Faculty, wrote Education and the second war, which covered European countries and Japan. This prefaced CIER’s work on education and conflict in countries such as Sierra Leone, Liberia, Lebanon, Palestine, and Afghanistan.

To reflect the broadening scope of its endeavours, the name was changed in 1996 to the Centre for International Education and Research (CIER), while under the directorship of Professor Lynn Davies.
