= Writing Caste Writing Gender: Narrating Dalit Women's Testimonios =

2006 book by Sharmila Rege

- Author: Sharmila Rege
- Language: English
- Publisher: Zubaan Books
- Publication date: 2006
- Publication place: India
- ISBN: 9788189013011

Writing Caste/Writing Gender: Narrating Dalit Women's Testimonios is a 2006 book written by Sharmila Rege and published by Zubaan, India. This book is a theoretical analysis of Dalit literature in India through the lens of gender. It is important for students of caste and gender studies.

== Introduction ==
The introduction of the book argues that the epistemological challenge posed by the Dalit movement and literature was lost to social science students. Engagement with Dalit theoretical perspectives throws light on ‘theoretical brahmins’ and ‘empirical shudras’. They point to the disjuncture between academic knowledge systems and social practices of caste. The reproduction of caste through idiom of citizenship or merit in post-Mandal era was the first major challenge to caste studies. The second was the Dalit feminists who challenged conceptualizing ‘genderless caste’ and ‘casteless gender’. The third major challenge to caste studies was the advocacy of Dalit human rights in Durban conference.

Although women's studies in India has fought for establishing gender as a category of analysis, the classical frameworks of understanding caste left marks in women's studies. Few women's studies scholars seriously engaged with Dalit feminist critiques. This can not be justified by savarna women ‘frozen in guilt’ i.e. assuming caste is the sole concern of Dalit women. The complex histories of caste and gender oppression get lost in it. Neither can it be justified by as some Dalit feminists contend, upper caste women will necessarily be brahmanical. In the second case, there is slippage of Brahman and brahmanical and non Brahman and non brahmanical.

The self-reflection of women who have power and privilege of caste implies recognizing differences, power and connections of caste, class and community, so as to challenge our manufactured ignorance about cultures who have been violently marginalized.

One of the central questions guiding this book is, how can ‘private’ lived experiences and the ‘public’ practices of anti-caste struggles be brought into analysis of caste and gender? This book is part of pedagogical strategy to address dilemmas in Gender and Dalit Studies. It ‘translates’ lived experiences of caste as articulated in Dalit women's ‘autobiographies’, or as the author uses the term, testimonios (Spanish term for testimony).

== Major arguments ==
In the section immediately following the introduction, the author debates the consumption and significance of Dalit testimonios. She argues that although publishing Dalit life narratives in English has gained popularity, the politics of consumption of Dalit literature is important to remember. The dangers of such politics are:

- Prioritization of certain type of literature and control of publishing by non-Dalits.
- The politics of selecting works, what is translated and by whom.

Various authors and historians like Anand Teltumbde and Gail Omvedt have tried to explain this spurt in publication after linking it to Durban conference and strategy of neo-liberal market to weaken/ co-opt Dalit movement. The popularity of Dalit autobiographies can be explained by reading them as narratives of pain without having to engage with politics and theory of Ambedkarism. Another serious issue is token inclusion of Dalit writings in the academy. In this context, Rege discusses issues which have been part of debates in Dalit literary circles of Maharashtra.

The debates on the naming of this literature of protest persisted since 1960s. The term Dalit was first used by Dr. Ambedkar in 1928 in Bahiskrut Bharat. Although some Dalit scholars argued against writing autobiographies (as digging stench of past), some defended the importance of this genre by underlining its specific characteristics and its importance for community. Pantawane and others have argued for political significance of Dalit life narratives. Despite arguments against bringing undesired past to present, it is undeniable that life narratives are most direct ways in addressing silence on and misinterpretation of Dalits.

Another very important argument made by Rege is that Dalit life narratives are testimonios, which speaks for and beyond individual. It contests the ‘official forgetting’ of histories of caste oppressions, struggles and resistance. Dalit life narratives become the testimonies that summoned the truth from past.

Drawing from Beverley, Rege argues that in a testimonio the intention is to communicate the situation of a group’s oppression and struggle. The narrator calls upon the reader to respond actively. On one hand, in testimonio or dalit life narratives, the individual seeks collective affirmation. On other hand, by publicly bringing their experiences, in a way they challenge communitarian control over self. This dialectics of self and community gains more significance in dalit women’s testimonios because their location as women in the community influences their articulation of gender concerns, thus challenging the singular communitarian notion of dalit community. As testimonios of caste based oppression, anti-caste struggles and resistance, dalit life narratives are necessary for building critical pedagogies on caste system, as against canonical view of caste as ideology which hides experiential dimensions of caste based oppression. Thus Rege makes a case for not reading them merely as narratives of pain minus the politics of the dalit movement, but as testimonios of caste based exploitation, everyday resistance and organized anti-caste struggles. Not only will it bring new theories/ understanding hut also at larger level, there will be democratization of knowledge.

In this context, what is the importance of dalit women’s testimonios? What is methodologically important is that do they remember and write differently? It is important to locate this difference in articulation of caste and women’s question historically. Therefore, in the next section she gives brief introduction to processes of caste, class formation and gender.

== Reception ==
Karin Kapadia reviewed the book in the journal Economic and Political Weekly. She argues that this book consists of Dalit oral history through the autobiographical narratives of eight Dalit women writers from Maharashtra. She places the value of book in the fact that it translated the narratives for the first time. She has a different view of the book when she says that the non-Brahmin interest is not necessarily Dalit interest.

Janaki Nair sees the contribution of the book in terms of enriching the Indian Feminist Historiography. She states:

“Rege’s choice of the term testimonios as opposed to autobiographies is in order to assert that the Dalit woman occupies a space that is subordinated to the authority of the community and its needs, and therefore that her subjectivity cannot be equated with a bourgeois individual subject and her story. This assertion further serves to counter the historical common sense that has homogenized the experience of the nationalist movement on the basis of select regional examples (notably Bengal and Punjab) of upper-caste, middle-class women…..Her re-renderings, her attention to the specific experience of Dalit oppression, and her striving to highlight the emergence of Dalit “counterpublics” are in order to challenge the historiographical orthodoxies that shut caste out of the public sphere to render it a social and not political issue.”

== See also ==
- World Conference against Racism 2001
