= Sharmila Rege =

Indian sociologist (1964–2013)

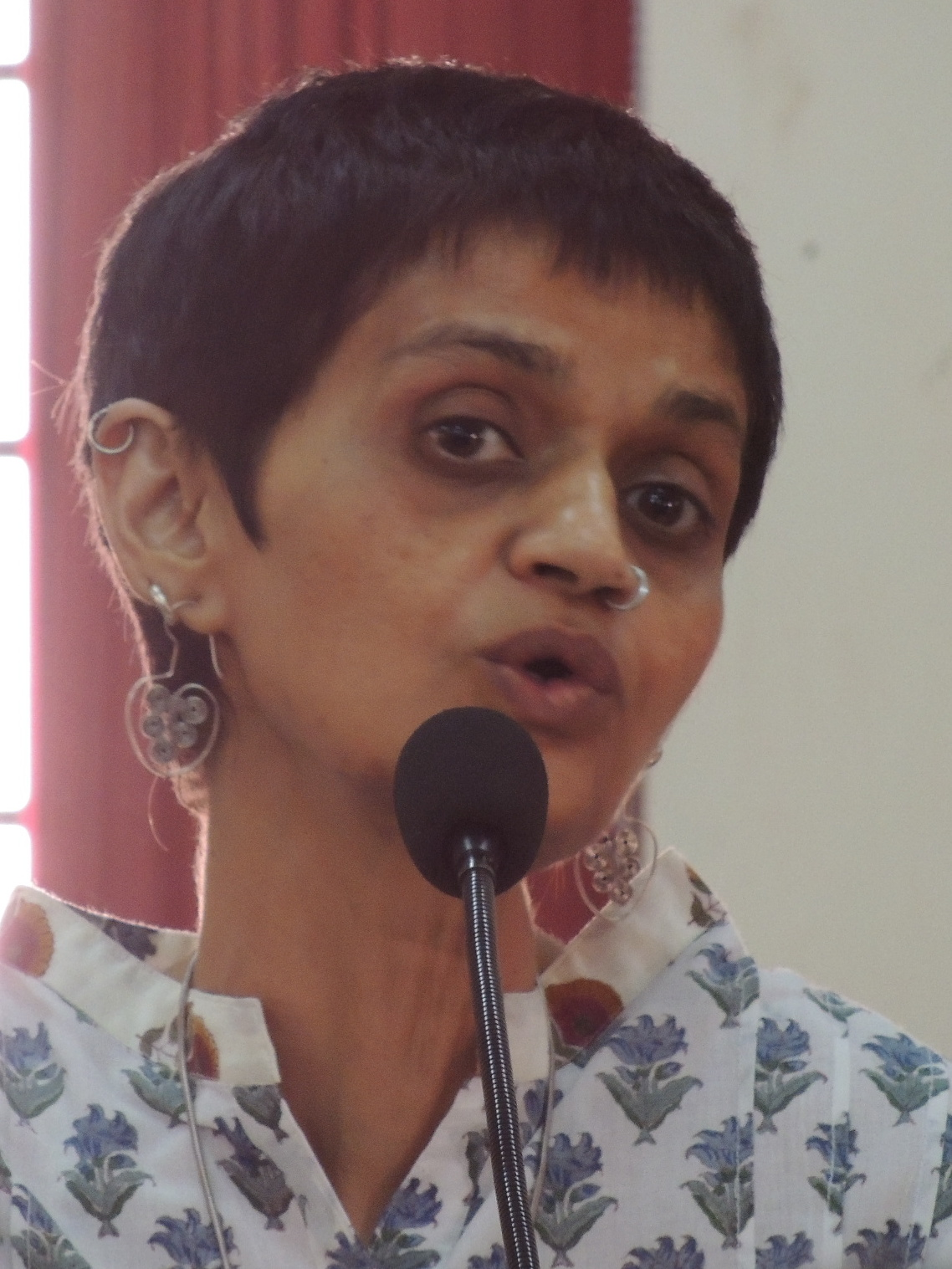
- Born: 7 October 1964; Pune, Maharashtra, India
- Died: 13 July 2013 (aged 48); Pune, Maharashtra, India
- Occupations: Sociologist, writer, feminist

Sharmila Rege (7 October 1964 – 13 July 2013) was an Indian sociologist, feminist scholar and author of Writing Caste, Writing Gender. She led the Krantijyoti Savitribai Phule Women's Studies Centre at the University of Pune since 1991. She received the Malcolm Adiseshiah Award for Distinguished Contributions to Development Studies from the Madras Institute of Development Studies (MIDS) in 2006. She died of colon cancer on 13 July 2013.

== Work ==
Rege was one of the leading feminist scholars in India, whose work in developing a "Dalit feminist standpoint perspective" was crucial in opening up feminist debates in India to questions of class, caste, religion and sexuality. An obituary described her as a "Phule-Ambedkarite feminist welder" who brought the "structural violence of caste and its linkages with sexuality and labour into the feminist discourse."

Rege worked within academia fighting for the rights of the Dalit students and was committed to critical educational reform in India. Her concerns around the woman question in India contributed to new and alternative methods of historiography, exposing the blind spots of a Hindu nation towards Dalit perspectives, as with her emphasis on relocating B. R. Ambedkar as central in the shaping of the modern nation-state. Her focus on alternative history brought local oral traditions of knowledge and cultural practice to public attention.

One of Rege's major texts was the essay "Interrogating the Thesis of 'Irrational Deification'", on popular Ambedkarism in the 1990s. It was first published in Economic and Political Weekly and reprinted in the volume The Hunger of the Republic: Our Present in Retrospect, published by Tulika Books.

In her last published work, Against the Madness of Manu, she sought to centralise Ambedkar's role in the women's movement by invoking his ideological fight against Brahminical patriarchy that engenders graded levels of violence against women.

In 2002, she established a child care centre in the University of Pune's women's studies department.

== Publications ==
- Caste and gender: the violence against women in India, European University Institute, 1996
- Sociology of Gender: The Challenge of Feminist Sociological Thought, SAGE Publications India, 2003
- Writing Caste, Writing Gender, Zubaan, 2006.
- Savitribai Phule Second Memorial Lecture, NCERT, 2009
- Against the Madness of Manu, Navayana, 2013.
