= Dalit studies =

Field of ethnographic research in India

Dalit studies is a new field of research in India which looks at the problem of marginalised groups, namely Dalits, tribals, religious minorities, women from excluded groups, denotified tribes, physically challenged and similar groups in economic, social and political spheres. Dalit studies scholars also undertake research on the nature and forms of discrimination and social exclusion faced by marginalised groups.

The broad objectives of Dalit studies can be delineated as follows:

- To undertake research to develop an understanding of the consequences of social exclusion and discrimination on economic growth and poverty, education, health, political participation and on the well-being of the marginalised social groups.
- To undertake research on policies to overcome discrimination, particularly 'exclusion and discrimination-induced deprivation' and its consequences.
- To provide knowledge support to policy-making bodies to develop inclusive policies.
- To provide knowledge support to international development and funding agencies to enable them to shape their approach and funding policies towards problems of excluded groups.
- To provide knowledge-support to civil society organisations at the grassroot, state and national levels.

== Institutions ==
- Indian Institute of Dalit Studies (IIDS) situated in New Delhi, headed by Sukhadeo Thorat.
- Institute of Dalit Studies and Research, Kolkata

== See also ==
- Nicolas Jaoul
- Eleanor Zelliot
- Dalit literature
