= Dubrovnik =

Coastal city in southern Croatia

- City
- Grad Dubrovnik; City of Dubrovnik
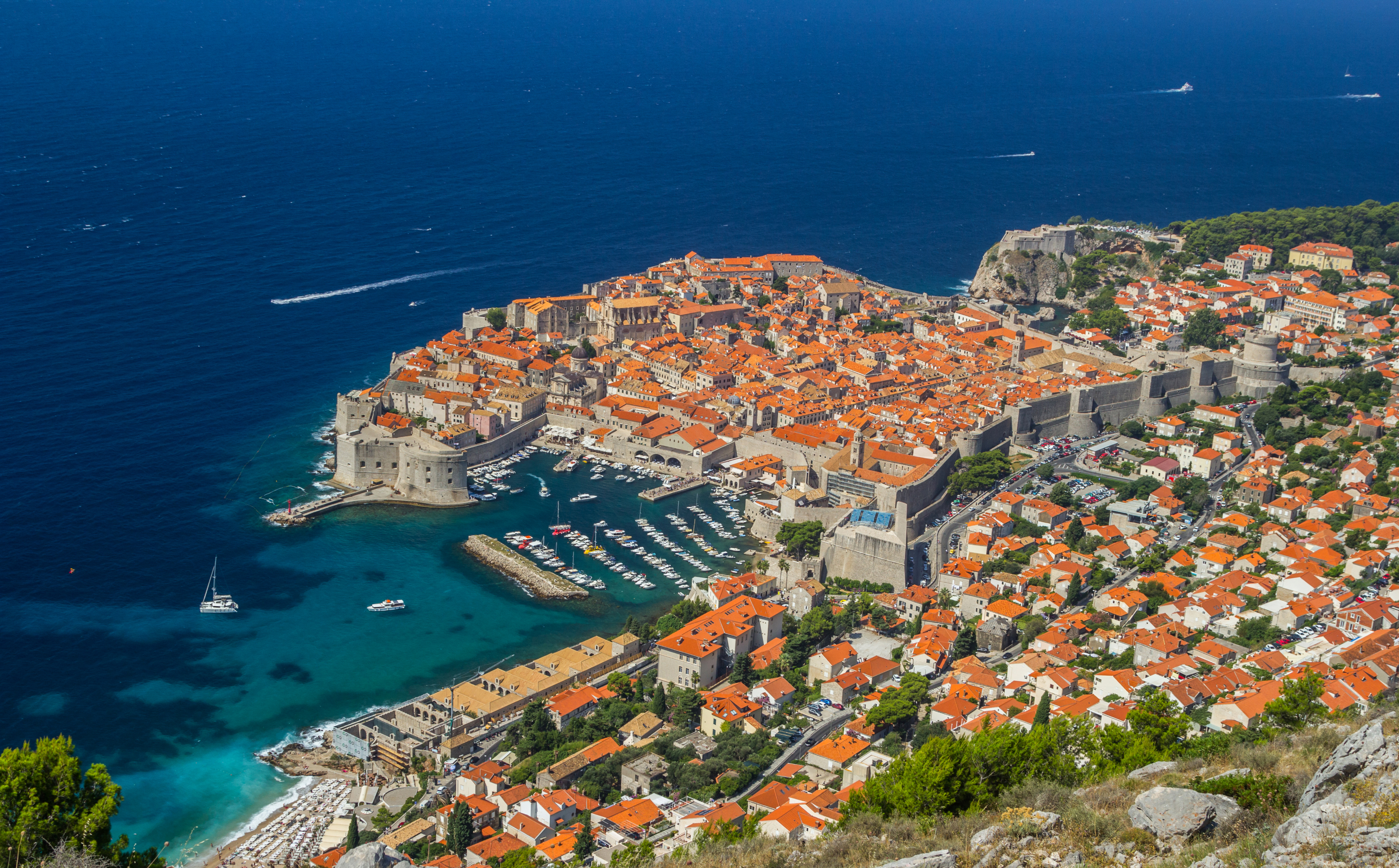
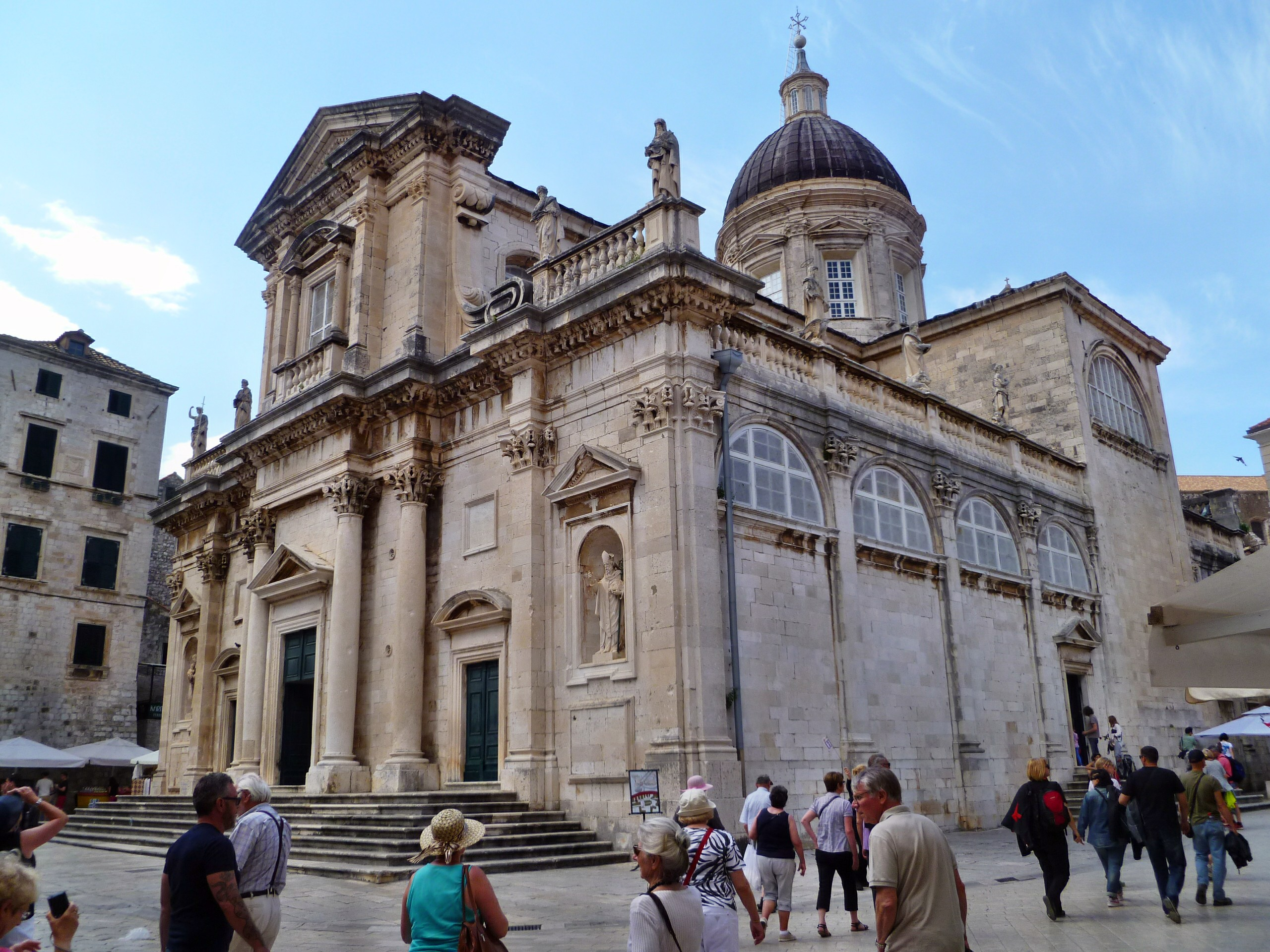
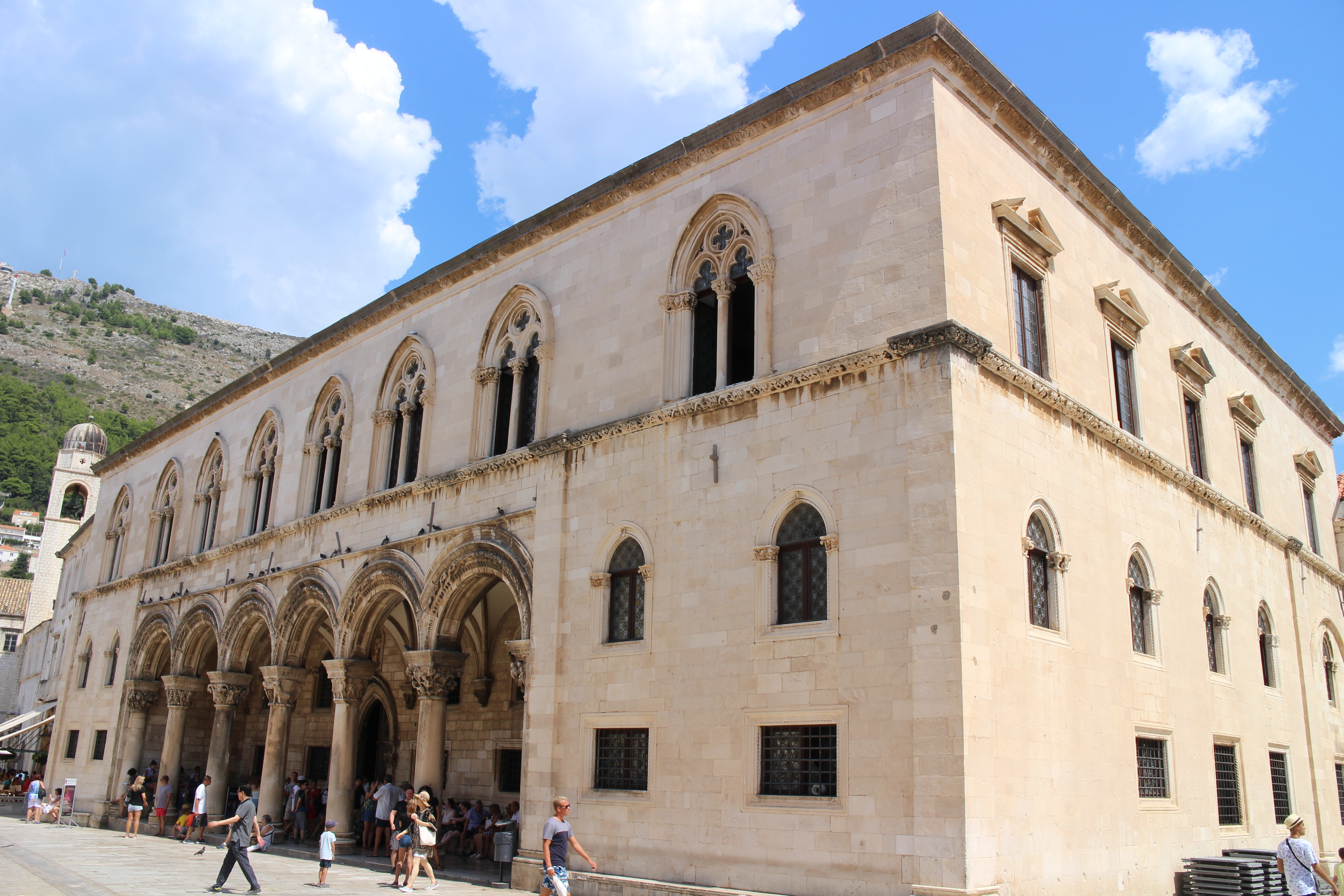
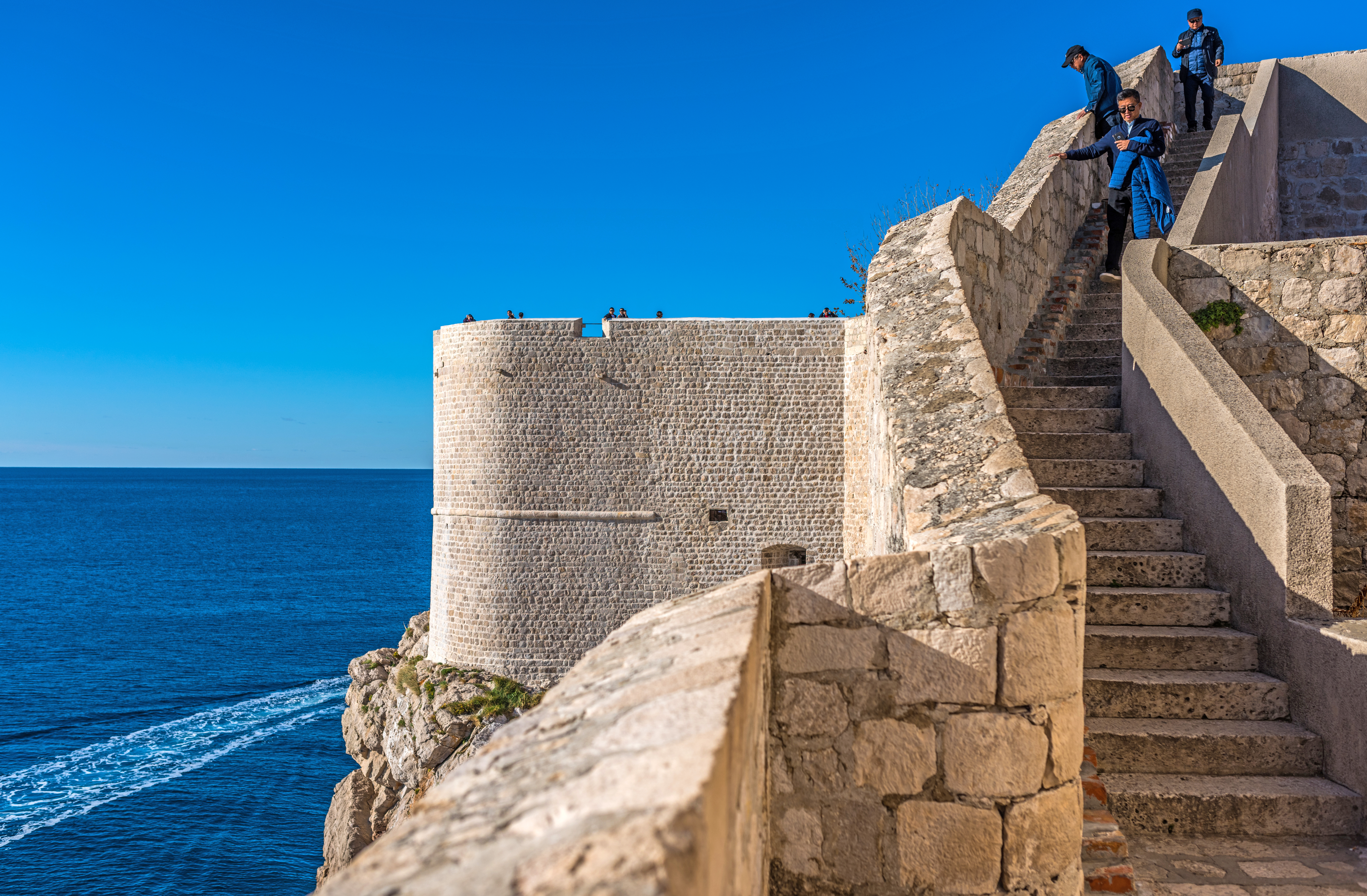
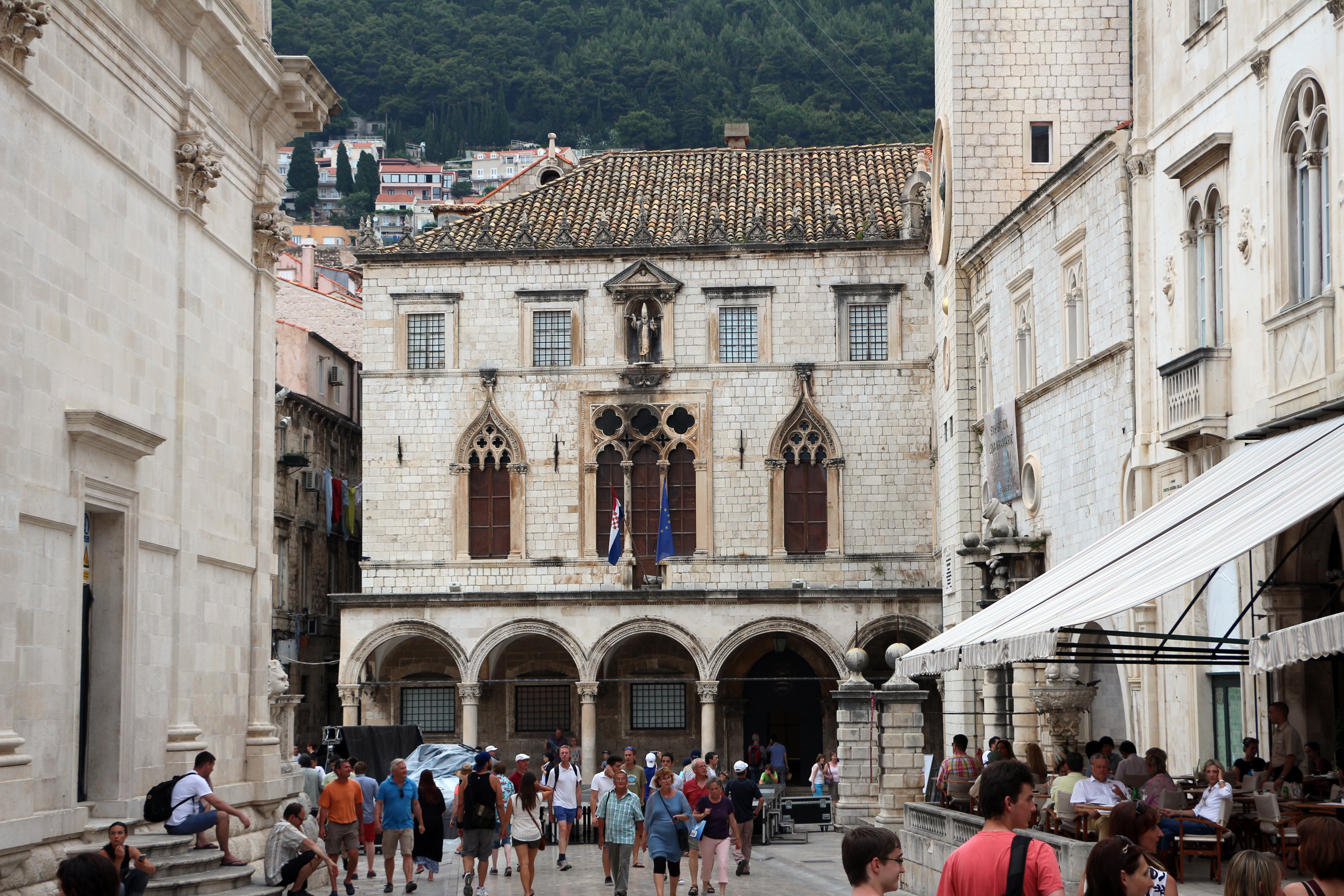
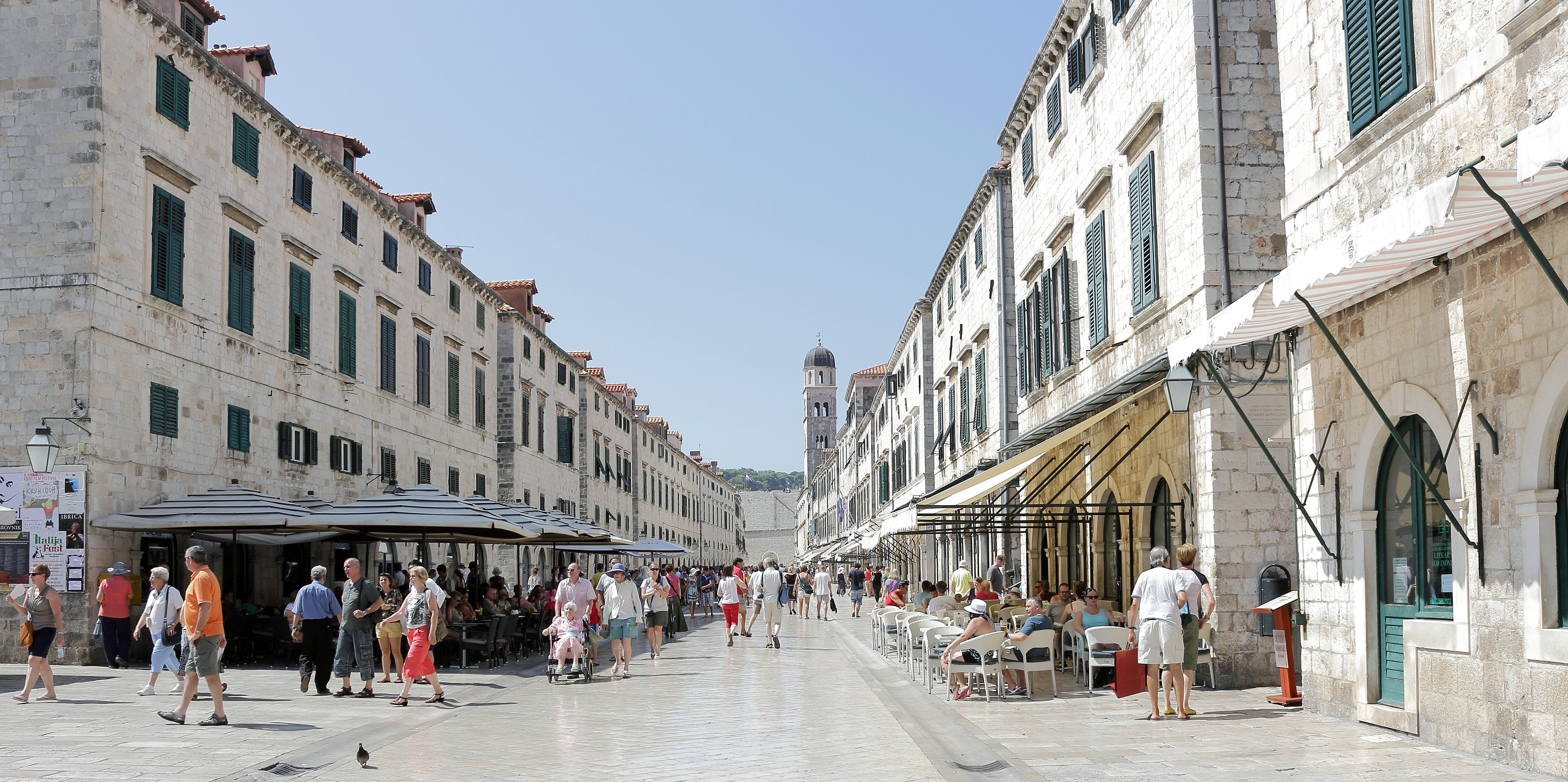
- Old town of Dubrovnik Dubrovnik Cathedral Rector's Palace Dubrovnik Walls Sponza Palace Stradun

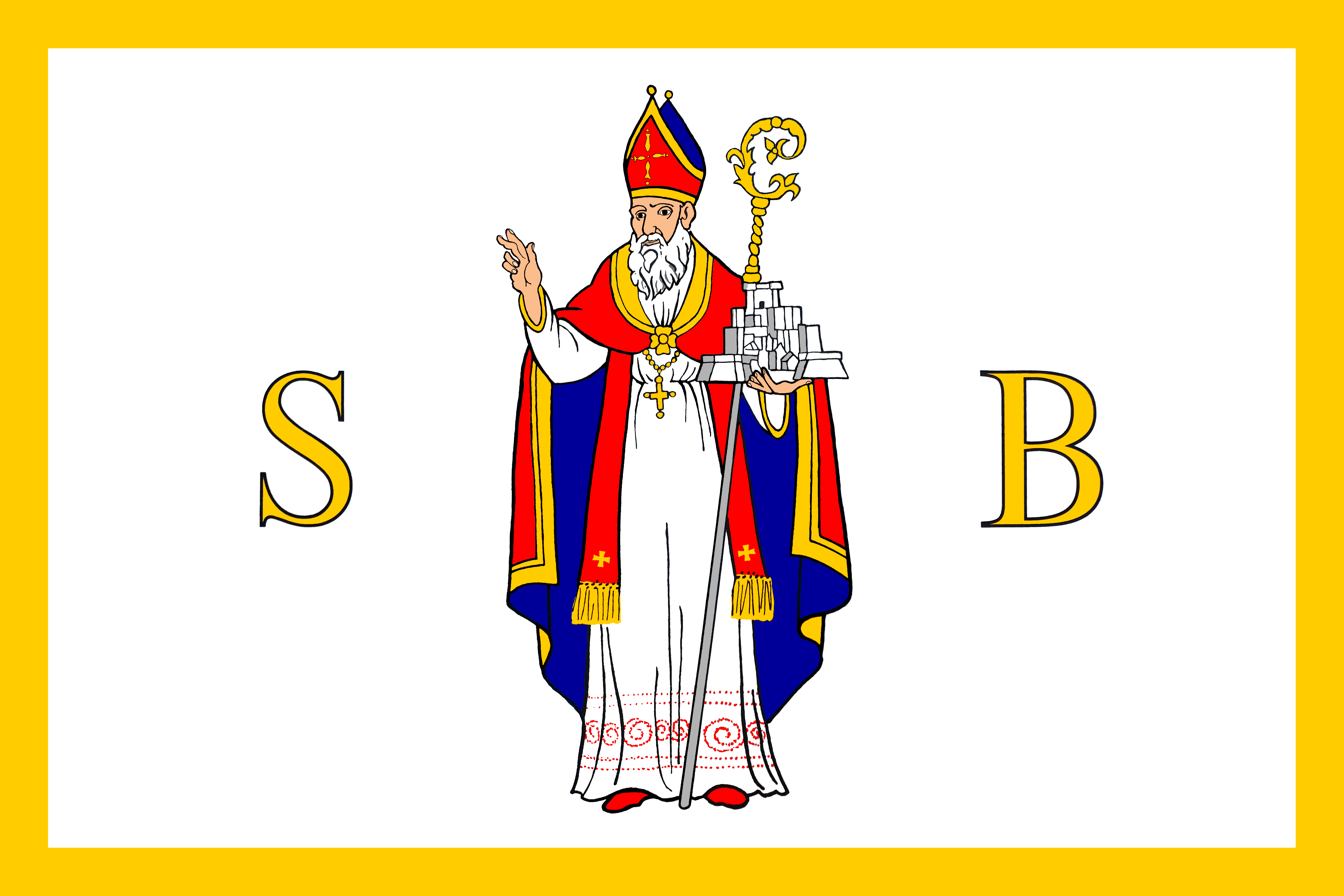
- Flag Coat of arms
- Nicknames: "Pearl of the Adriatic", "Thesaurum mundi"
- Interactive map of Dubrovnik
- The location of Dubrovnik within Croatia Dubrovnik (Europe)
- Coordinates: 42°38′25″N 18°06′30″E
- Country: Croatia
- Region: Dalmatia
- County: Dubrovnik-Neretva County

Government
  - Type: Mayor-Council
  - Mayor: Mato Franković (HDZ)
  - City Council: 21 members: • HDZ, HSU, HS (9); • SJG–Možemo! (3); • DDS (3); • SDP (2); • DUSTRA (2); • Centre (2)

Area
  - City: 142.6 km^{2} (55.1 sq mi)
  - Urban: 12.1 km^{2} (4.7 sq mi)
- Elevation: 3 m (9.8 ft)

Population (2021)
  - City: 41,562
  - Density: 291.5/km^{2} (754.9/sq mi)
  - Urban: 26,922
  - Urban density: 2,220/km^{2} (5,760/sq mi)
  - Metro: 65,808
- Demonym(s): Dubrovčanin (hr, male); Dubrovčanka (hr, female); Dubrovkinja (local, female)
- Time zone: UTC+1 (CET)
  - Summer (DST): UTC+2 (CEST)
- Postal code: HR-20 000
- Area code: +385 20
- Vehicle registration: DU
- Patron saint: Saint Blaise
- Website: dubrovnik.hr

UNESCO World Heritage Site
- Official name: Old City of Dubrovnik
- Criteria: Cultural: (i)(iii)(iv)
- Reference: 95
- Inscription: 1979 (3rd Session)
- Area: 96.7 ha (239 acres)

Dubrovnik, (Note: Croatian: [dǔbroːʋniːk], UK: /d(j)ʊˈbrɒvnɪk/ dyuu-BROV-nik, US: /duːˈ-/ doo-;) historically also known as Ragusa, (Note: Italian: [raˈɡuːza]) is a city in southern Dalmatia, Croatia, by the Adriatic Sea. It is one of the most prominent tourist destinations in the Mediterranean, a seaport and the centre of the Dubrovnik-Neretva County. In 2021, its total population was 41,562. Recognizing its outstanding medieval architecture and fortifications, UNESCO inscribed the Old City of Dubrovnik as a World Heritage Site in 1979.

The history of the city probably dates back to the 7th century, when the town known as Ragusa was founded by refugees from Epidaurum (Ragusa Vecchia). It was under protectorate of the Byzantine Empire and later under the sovereignty of the Republic of Venice. Between the 14th and 19th centuries, Dubrovnik ruled itself as a free state. The prosperity of the city was historically based on maritime trade; as the capital of the maritime Republic of Ragusa, it achieved a high level of development, particularly during the 15th and 16th centuries, as it became notable for its wealth and skilled diplomacy. At the same time, Dubrovnik became a cradle of Croatian literature. In his letter to Nikola Nalješković (1564), poet Ivan Vidalić named it the "crown of Croatian cities".

The entire city was almost destroyed in a devastating earthquake in 1667. During the Napoleonic Wars, Dubrovnik was occupied by the French Empire forces, and then the Republic of Ragusa was abolished and incorporated into the Napoleonic Kingdom of Italy and later into the Illyrian Provinces of France. From the early 19th to early 20th centuries, Dubrovnik was part of the Kingdom of Dalmatia within the Austrian Empire. Dubrovnik became part of the Kingdom of Yugoslavia immediately upon its creation, and it was incorporated into its Zeta Banovina in 1929, before becoming part of the Banovina of Croatia upon its creation in 1939. During World War II, it was part of the Independent State of Croatia, an Axis puppet state, before being reincorporated into the Socialist Republic of Croatia in the Socialist Federal Republic of Yugoslavia.

In 1991, during the Croatian War of Independence, Dubrovnik was besieged by the Yugoslav People's Army for seven months and suffered significant damage from shelling. After undergoing repair and restoration works in the 1990s and early 2000s, it re-emerged as one of the Mediterranean's top tourist destinations, as well as a popular filming location. Often called "The Queen of the Adriatic" Dubrovnik is considered one of the most popular destinations in the Adriatic and in Europe.

== Names ==
The names Dubrovnik and Ragusa co-existed for several centuries. Ragusa, recorded in various forms since at least the 10th century (in Latin, Dalmatian, Italian; in Venetian: Raguxa), remained the official name of the Republic of Ragusa until 1808, and of the city within the Kingdom of Dalmatia until 1918, while Dubrovnik, first recorded in the late 12th century, was in widespread use by the late 16th or early 17th century.

The name Dubrovnik of the Adriatic city is first recorded in the Charter of Ban Kulin (1189). The most common explanation for the origin is from a Proto-Slavic word *dǫbъ meaning 'oak', and the term dubrovnik referring to 'oak wood' or 'oak forest', as dǫbrava means 'oakwood', 'forest'.

The historical name Ragusa is recorded in the Greek form Ῥαούσιν (Rhaousin, Latinized Ragusium) in the 10th century. It was recorded in various forms in the medieval period, Rausia, Lavusa, Labusa, Raugia, Rachusa. Various attempts have been made to etymologize the name. Suggestions include derivation from Greek ῥάξ, ῥαγός "grape"; from Greek ῥώξ, ῥωγός "narrow passage"; Greek ῥωγάς "ragged (of rocks)", ῥαγή (ῥαγάς) "fissure"; from the name of the Epirote tribe of the Rhogoi, from an unidentified Illyrian substrate. A connection to the name of Sicilian Ragusa has also been proposed. It has been proposed by V. Orel that the Proto-Albanian *rāguša of Albanian rrush 'grape' is related to Ragusa or the source of the name. Putanec (1993) gives a review of etymological suggestion, and favours an explanation of the name as pre-Greek ("Pelasgian"), from a root cognate to Greek ῥαγή "fissure", with a suffix -ussa also found in the Greek name of Brač, Elaphousa. The name of the city in the native Dalmatian language, now extinct, was Ragusa, as shown by a 1325 letter in Dalmatian. In Albanian, the city was historically referred to as Rush (Albanian definite form: Rushi), from Latin Ragusium.

The classical explanation of the name is due to Constantine VII's De Administrando Imperio (10th century). According to this account, Ragusa (Ῥαούσιν) is the foundation of the refugees from Epidaurum (Ragusa Vecchia), a Greek city situated some 15 km (9 mi) to the south of Ragusa, when that city was destroyed in the Slavic incursions of the 7th century. The name is explained as a corruption of a Dalmatae/Romance word Lausa, the name of the rocky island on which the city was built (connected by Constantine to Greek λᾶας "rock, stone").

== History ==
=== Origins ===
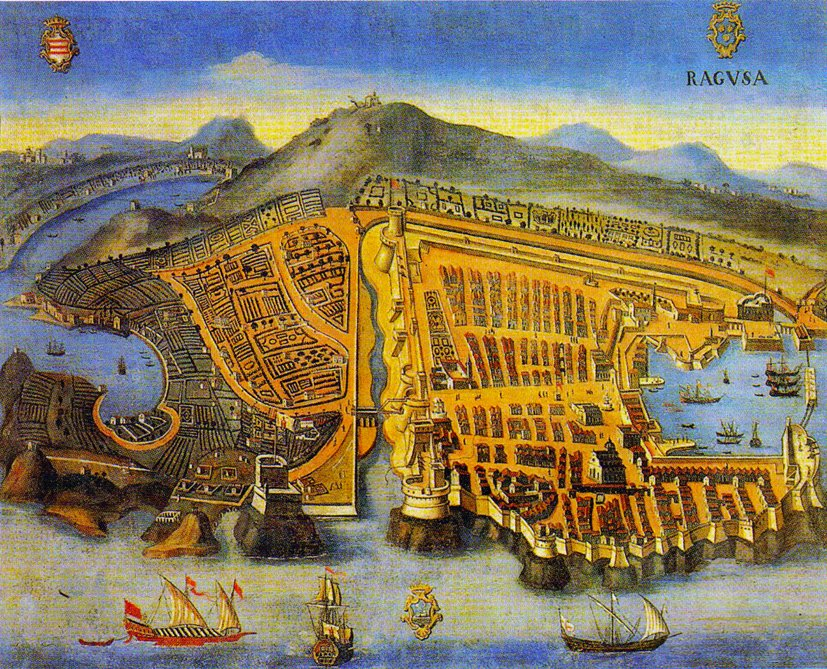
Painting of Ragusa from 1667

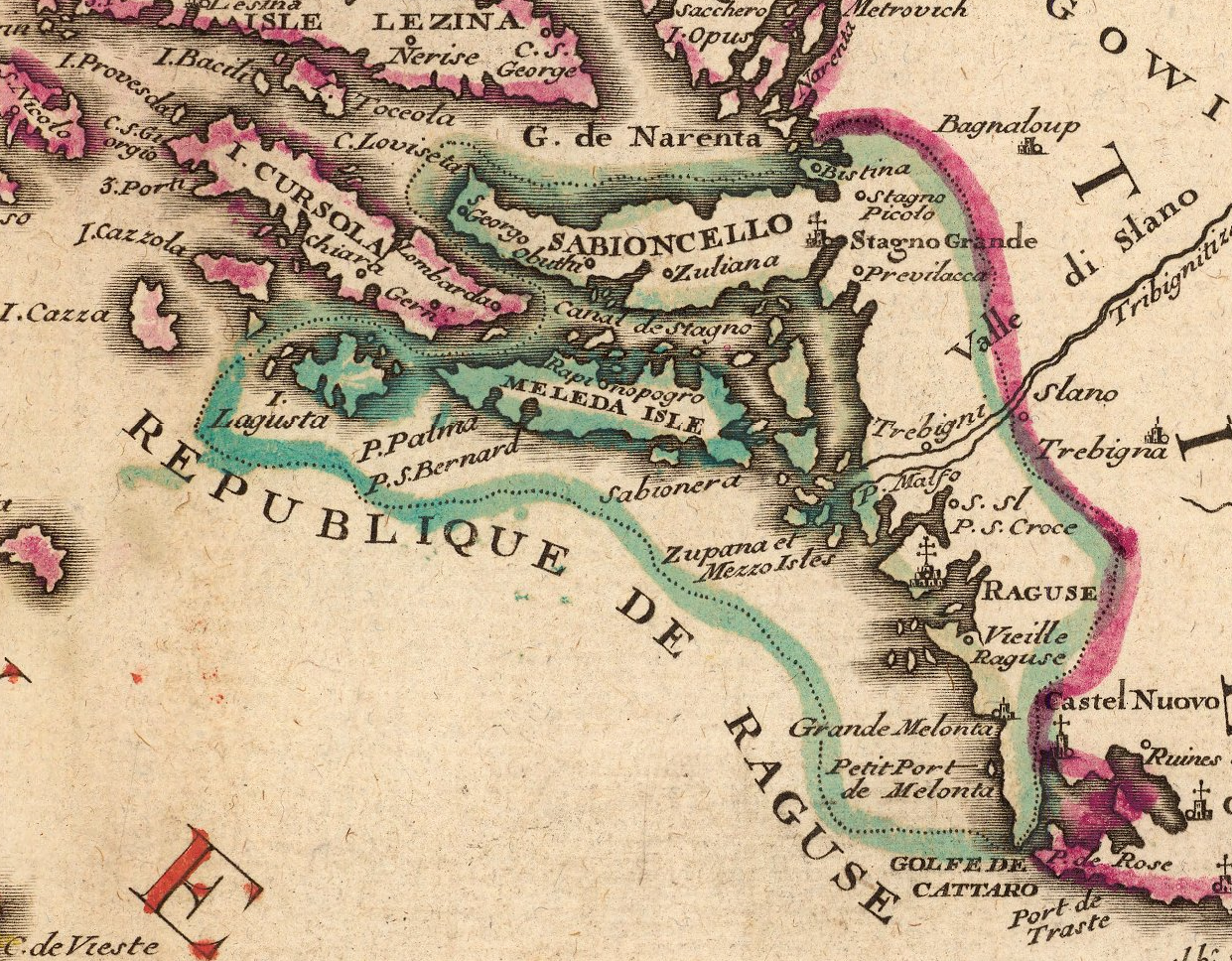
Territory of the Republic of Ragusa in the early 18th century. Cropped from a map by French cartographer Nicolas de Fer titled Le Golfe de Venise (etc.). Circa 1716.

Dubrovnik was inhabited by the Illyrian tribe of Pleraei in ancient times. According to Constantine Porphyrogenitus's De Administrando Imperio (c. 950), Ragusa was founded in the 7th century, named after a "rocky island" called Lausa, by refugees from Epidaurum (Ragusa Vecchia), a Roman city situated some 15 km (9.3 mi) to the south, when that city was destroyed by Slavs fighting with the Avars. It was one of the Dalmatian city-states.

Excavations in 2007 revealed a Byzantine basilica from the 8th century and parts of the city walls. The size of the old basilica clearly indicates that there was quite a large settlement at the time. There is also evidence for the presence of a settlement in the pre-Christian era, most notably the finding of ancient coins from the 3rd and 2nd century BC, as well as archeological fragments from the 1st century BC in the area of the old City port.

Antun Ničetić, in his 1996 book Povijest dubrovačke luke ("History of the Port of Dubrovnik"), expounds the theory that Dubrovnik was established by Greek sailors, as a station halfway between the two Greek settlements of Budva and Korčula, 95 nautical miles (176 km; 109 mi) apart from each of them.

=== Republic of Ragusa ===
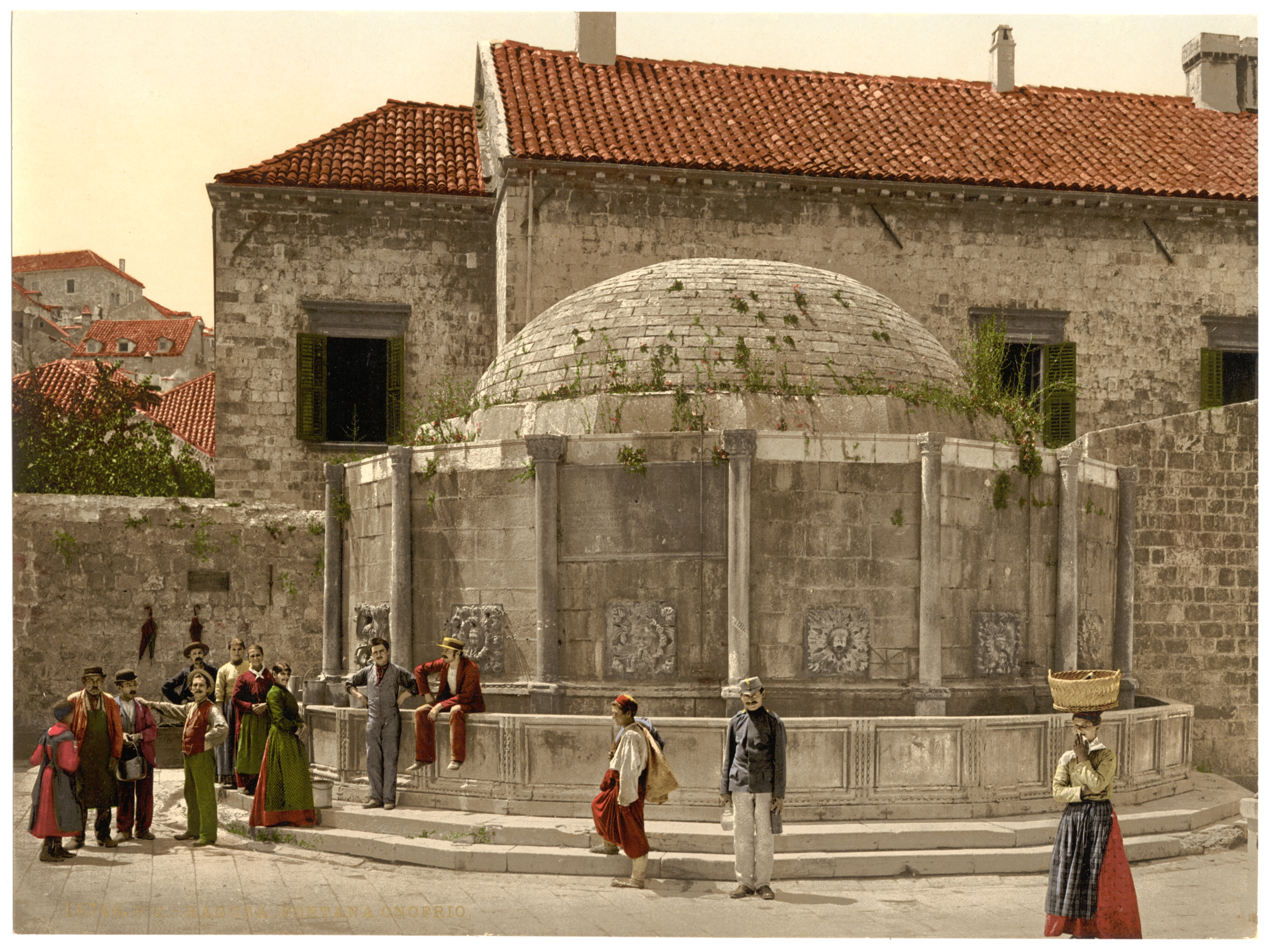
A 1900 photochrom of the Big Onofrio's fountain (1438)

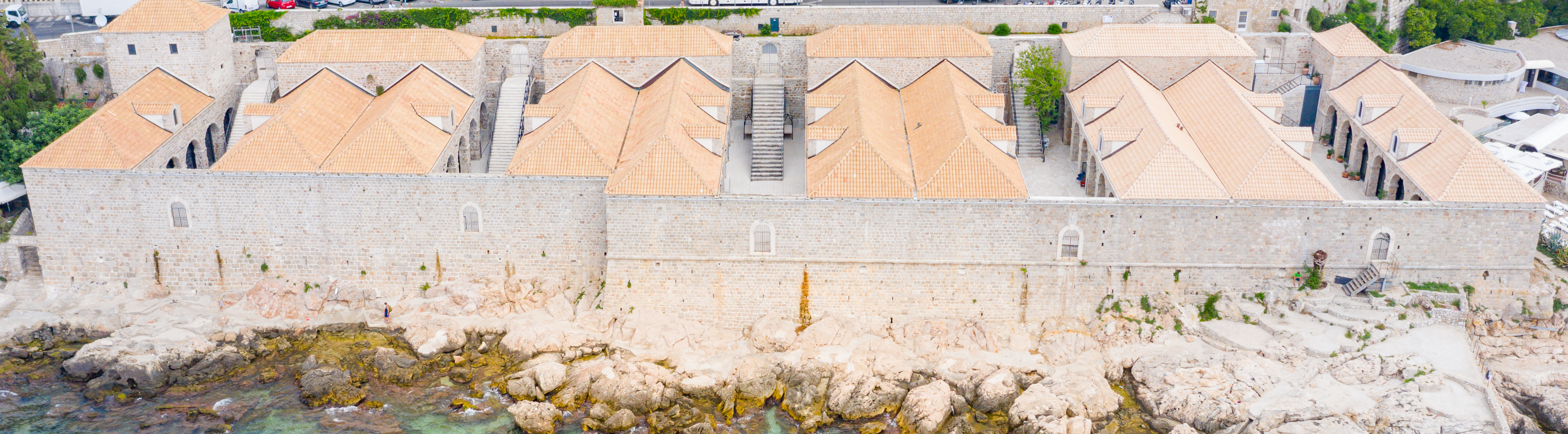
Aerial view of Lazareti complex

After the fall of the Ostrogothic Kingdom, the town came under the protection of the Byzantine Empire. In the 12th and 13th centuries, Dubrovnik grew into an oligarchic republic. After the Crusades, Dubrovnik came under the sovereignty of Venice (1205–1358), which would give its institutions to the Dalmatian city. In 1240 Ragusa purchased the island of Lastovo from Stefan Uroš I, king of Serbia, who had rights over the island as ruler of parts of Zachlumia. After a fire destroyed most of the city on the night of August 16, 1296, a new urban plan was developed. By the Peace Treaty of Zadar in 1358, Dubrovnik achieved relative independence as a vassal-state of the Kingdom of Hungary.

Between the 14th century and 1808, Dubrovnik ruled itself as a free state, although it was a tributary from 1382 to 1804 of the Ottoman Empire and paid an annual tribute to its sultan. The Republic reached its peak in the 15th and 16th centuries, when its thalassocracy rivalled that of the Republic of Venice and other Italian maritime republics.

There are also signs of a long established Albanian population in the Ragusan hinterlands since at least the Medieval period. And a Ragusan document dating to 1285 states: "I heard a voice crying in the mountains in Albanian" (Audivi unam vocem clamantem in monte in lingua albanesca).

For centuries, Dubrovnik was an ally of Ancona, the other Adriatic maritime republic rival of Venice, which was itself the Ottoman Empire's chief rival for control of the Adriatic. This alliance enabled the two towns set on opposite sides of the Adriatic to resist attempts by the Venetians to make the Adriatic a "Venetian Bay", also controlling directly or indirectly all the Adriatic ports. Ancona and Dubrovnik developed an alternative trade route to the Venetian (Venice–Austria–Germany): starting in Dubrovnik it went on to Ancona, through Florence and ended in Flanders. Ragusa was an important base for the traffic of the Balkan slave trade, from which slaves were transported from the Balkans across the Adriatic Sea to the Aegean Sea, from which they were sold on to either Spain in the West or Egypt in the South.

The Republic of Ragusa received its own Statutes as early as 1272, which, among other things, codified Roman practice and local customs. The Statutes included prescriptions for town planning and the regulation of quarantine (for sanitary reasons).

The Republic was an early adopter of what are now regarded as modern laws and institutions: a medical service was introduced in 1301, with the first pharmacy, still operating to this day, being opened in 1317. An almshouse was opened in 1347, and the first quarantine hospital (Lazarete) was established in 1377. Slave trading was abolished in 1418, and an orphanage opened in 1432. A 20 km (12 mi) water supply system, instead of a cistern, was constructed in 1438 by the Neapolitan architect and engineer Onofrio della Cava. He completed the aqueduct with two public fountains. He also built a number of mills along one of its branches.

The city was ruled by the local aristocracy which was of Latin-Dalmatian extraction and formed two city councils. As usual for the time, they maintained a strict system of social classes. The republic abolished the slave trade early in the 15th century and valued liberty highly. The city successfully balanced its sovereignty between the interests of Venice and the Ottoman Empire for centuries.

Latin was originally used in official documents of the Republic. Italian came to use in the early 15th century. A variant of the Dalmatian language was among the spoken ones, and was influenced by Croatian and Italian. The presence of Croatian in everyday speech increased in the late 13th century, and in literary works in the mid-15th century. In the coming decades, Dubrovnik became a cradle of Croatian literature.

The economic wealth of the Republic was partially the result of the land it developed, but especially of seafaring trade. With the help of skilled diplomacy, Dubrovnik merchants travelled lands freely and the city had a huge fleet of merchant ships (known as argosy) that travelled all over the world. From these travels they founded some settlements, from India (cf. Ragusan trade with India) to America, and brought parts of their culture and flora home with them. One of its keys to success was not conquering, but trading and sailing under a white flag with the Latin: Libertas word (freedom) prominently featured on it. The flag was adopted when slave trading was abolished in 1418.

In search of Indian spices and textiles, merchants from Dubrovnik arrived in Goa, India, and settled in what is now called Gandauli. The people of Dubrovnik arrived in the Portuguese colony of Goa between 1530 and 1535, and after that they founded their own colony, Sao Braz, named after the patron saint of Dubrovnik, St. Blaise. The church was built around 1563 and was a replica of the original church of St. Blaise in Dubrovnik. About 12,000 inhabitants lived in São Braz and was a thriving colony until the 1570s when trade between Croats and Indians declined.

Many Conversos, Jews from Spain and Portugal who converted to Christianity, were attracted to the city. In May 1544, a ship landed there filled exclusively with Portuguese refugees, as Balthasar de Faria reported to King John. During this time one of the most famous cannon and bell founders of his time worked in the city: Ivan Rabljanin (also known as Magister Johannes Baptista Arbensis de la Tolle). By 1571 Dubrovnik had sold its protection over some Christian settlements in other parts of the Ottoman Empire to France and Venice. At that time there was also a colony of Dubrovnik in Fes in Morocco. The bishop of Dubrovnik was a Cardinal protector in 1571, at that time there were only 16 other countries which had Cardinal protectors.

Dubrovnik was a tributary state of the Ottoman Empire at one time. From this, they gained benefits such as access to the Black Sea, paid less customs duties (they however needed to make tribute payments) and had the diplomatic support of the Turks in trade disputes against the Venetians. This status also allowed increased trade with the inland regions through the Balkan overland trade which made merchants from Dubrovnik to build up a strong network unequaled with other Christian states.

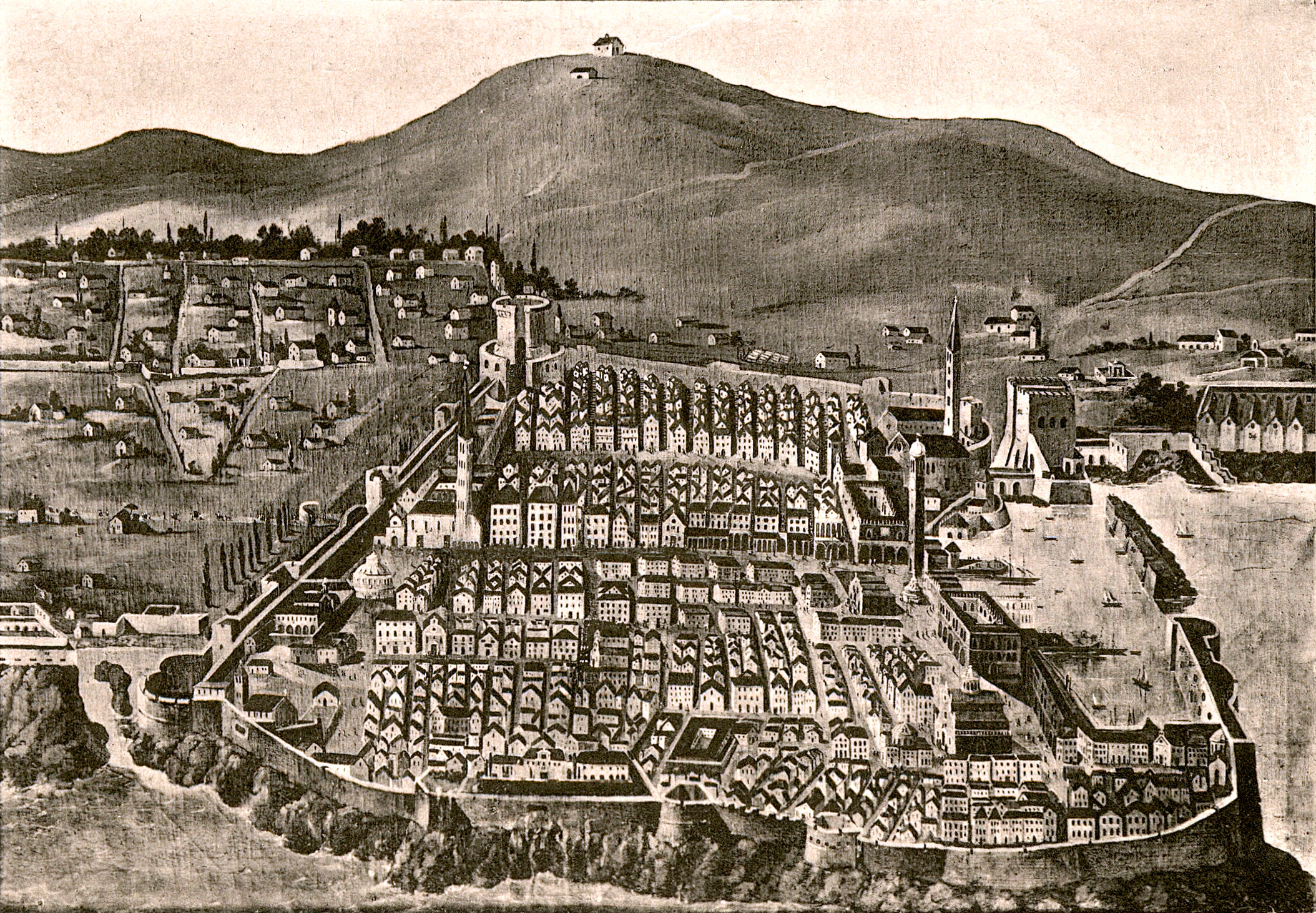
Dubrovnik before the earthquake in 1667

The Republic gradually declined due to a combination of a Mediterranean shipping crisis and the catastrophic earthquake of 1667 that killed over 5,000 citizens, levelled most of the public buildings and, consequently, negatively affected the well-being of the Republic. In 1699, the Republic was forced to sell two mainland patches of its territory to the Ottomans in order to avoid being caught in the clash with advancing Venetian forces. Today this strip of land belongs to Bosnia and Herzegovina and is that country's only direct access to the Adriatic. A highlight of Dubrovnik's diplomacy was the involvement in the American Revolution.

=== Early modern period ===
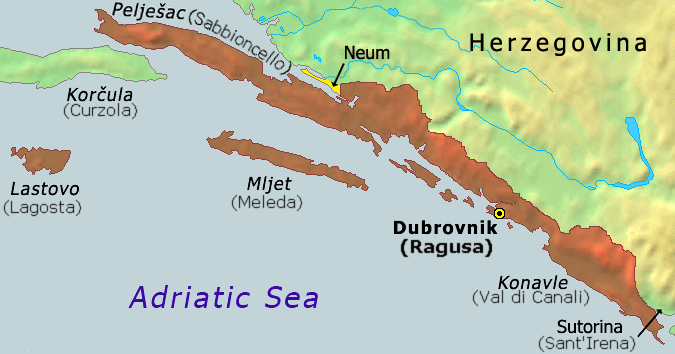
Territory of the Republic before 1808

On 27 May 1806, the forces of the Empire of France occupied the neutral Republic of Ragusa. Upon entering Ragusan territory without permission and approaching the capital, the French General Jacques Lauriston demanded that his troops be allowed to rest and be provided with food and drink in the city before continuing on to take possession of their holdings in the Bay of Kotor. However, this was a deception because as soon as they entered the city, they proceeded to occupy it in the name of Napoleon. Almost immediately after the beginning of the French occupation, Russian and Montenegrin troops entered Ragusan territory and began fighting the French army, raiding and pillaging everything along the way and culminating in a siege of the occupied city during which 3,000 cannonballs fell on it. In 1808 Marshal Marmont issued a proclamation abolishing the Republic of Ragusa and amalgamating its territory into the French Empire's client state, the Napoleonic Kingdom of Italy. Marmont claimed the newly created title of "Duke of Ragusa" (Duc de Raguse) and in 1810 Ragusa, together with Istria and Dalmatia, went to the newly created French Illyrian Provinces.

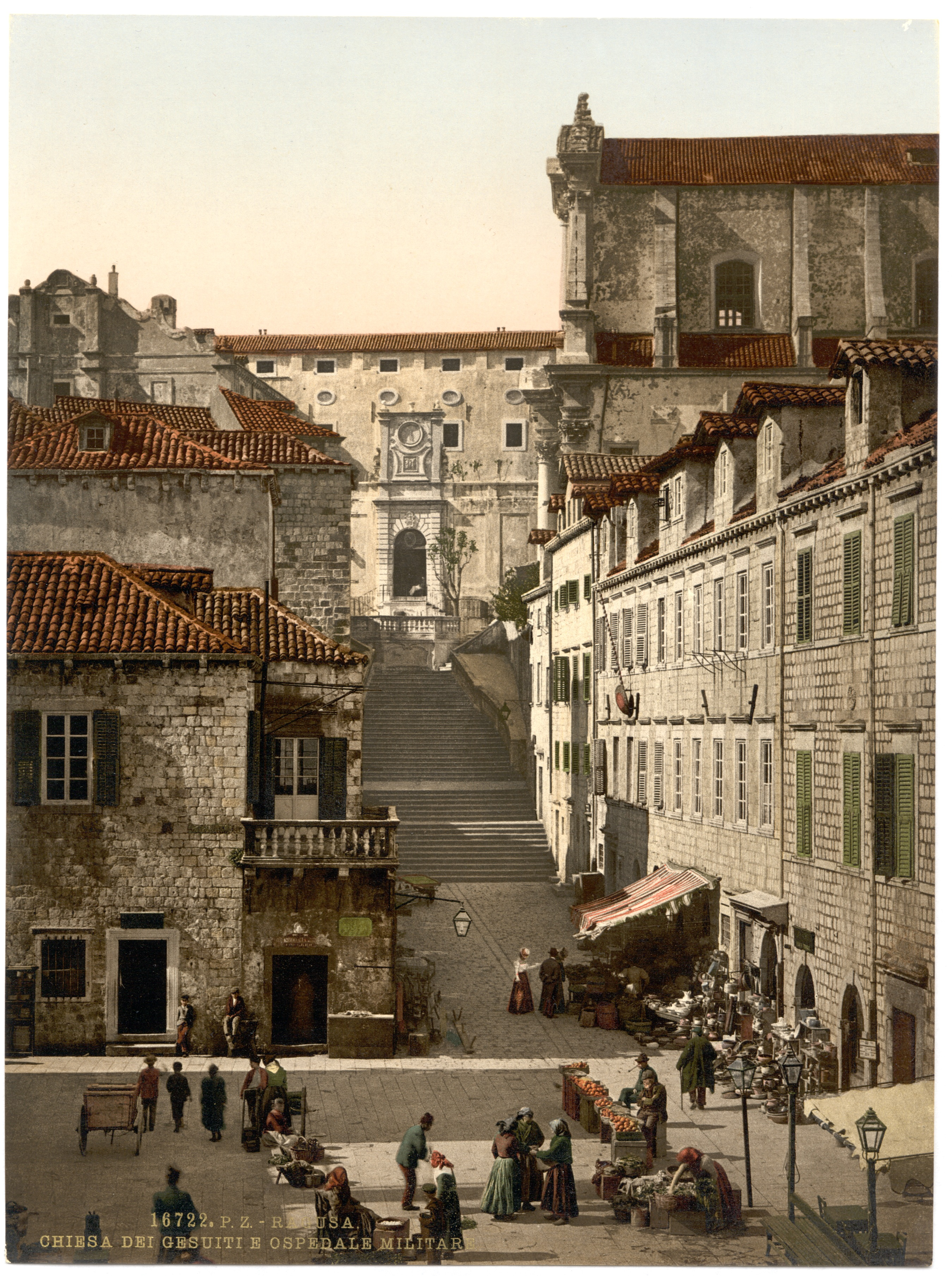
Dubrovnik's former Jesuit college and Jesuit stairs c. 1900

After seven years of French occupation, encouraged by the desertion of French soldiers after the failed invasion of Russia and the reentry of Austria in the war, all the social classes of the Ragusan people rose up in a general insurrection, led by the patricians, against the Napoleonic invaders. On 18 June 1813, together with British forces they forced the surrender of the French garrison of the island of Šipan, soon also the heavily fortified town of Ston and the island of Lopud, after which the insurrection spread throughout the mainland, starting with Konavle. They then laid siege to the occupied city, helped by the British Royal Navy, who had enjoyed unopposed domination over the Adriatic sea, under the command of Captain William Hoste, with his ships HMS Bacchante and HMS Saracen. Soon the population inside the city joined the insurrection. The Austrian Empire sent a force under General Todor Milutinović offering to help their Ragusan allies. However, as was soon shown, their intention was to in fact replace the French occupation of Ragusa with their own. Seducing one of the temporary governors of the Republic, Biagio Bernardo Caboga, with promises of power and influence (which were later cut short and who died in ignominy, branded as a traitor by his people), they managed to convince him that the gate to the east was to be kept closed to the Ragusan forces and to let the Austrian forces enter the city from the west, without any Ragusan soldiers, once the French garrison of 500 troops under General Joseph de Montrichard had surrendered.

After this, the Flag of Saint Blaise was flown alongside the Austrian and British colors, but only for two days because, on 30 January, General Milutinović ordered Mayor Sabo Giorgi to lower it. Overwhelmed by a feeling of deep patriotic pride, Giorgi, the last Rector of the Republic, refused to do so "for the masses had hoisted it". Subsequent events proved that Austria took every possible opportunity to invade the entire coast of the eastern Adriatic, from Venice to Kotor. The Austrians did everything in their power to eliminate the Ragusa issue at the Congress of Vienna. Ragusan representative Miho Bona, elected at the last meeting of the Major Council, was denied participation in the Congress, while Milutinović, prior to the final agreement of the allies, assumed complete control of the city.

Regardless of the fact that the government of the Ragusan Republic never signed any capitulation nor relinquished its sovereignty, which according to the rules of Klemens von Metternich that Austria adopted for the Vienna Congress should have meant that the Republic would be restored, the Austrian Empire managed to convince the other allies to allow it to keep the territory of the Republic. While many smaller and less significant cities and former countries were permitted an audience, that right was refused to the representative of the Ragusan Republic. All of this was in blatant contradiction to the solemn treaties that the Austrian Emperors signed with the Republic: the first on 20 August 1684, in which Leopold I promises and guarantees inviolate liberty ("inviolatam libertatem") to the Republic, and the second in 1772, in which the Empress Maria Theresa promises protection and respect of the inviolability of the freedom and territory of the Republic.

=== Languages ===
The "Libertas" Flag of Dubrovnik

The official language until 1472 was Latin. As a consequence of the increasing migration of Slavic populations from inland Dalmatia, the language spoken by much of the population was Croatian, typically referred to in Dubrovnik's historical documents simply as "Slavic". To oppose the demographic change due to increased Slavic immigration from the Balkans, the native Romance population of Ragusa, which made up the oligarchic government of the Republic, tried to prohibit the use of any Slavic languages in official councils. Archeologists have also discovered medieval Glagolitic tablets near Dubrovnik, such as the inscription of Župa Dubrovačka, indicating that the Glagolitic script was also likely once used in the city.

The Italian language as spoken in the republic was heavily influenced by the Venetian language and the Tuscan dialect. Italian took root among the Dalmatian-speaking merchant upper classes, as a result of Venetian influence which strengthened the original Latin element of the population.

On 14 July 1284 in Ragusa, the Albanian language was attested for the first time in history when a crime witness testified: "I heard a voice crying on the mountain in the Albanian language" (Latin: Audivi unam vocem, clamantem in monte in lingua albanesca).

=== Austrian rule ===
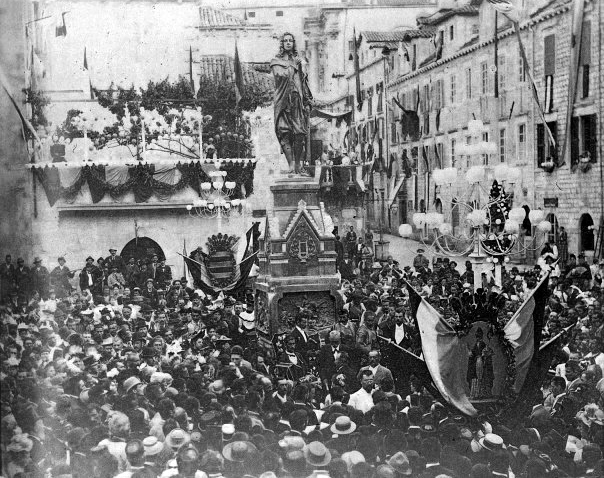
Unveiling of the Gundulić monument in 1893

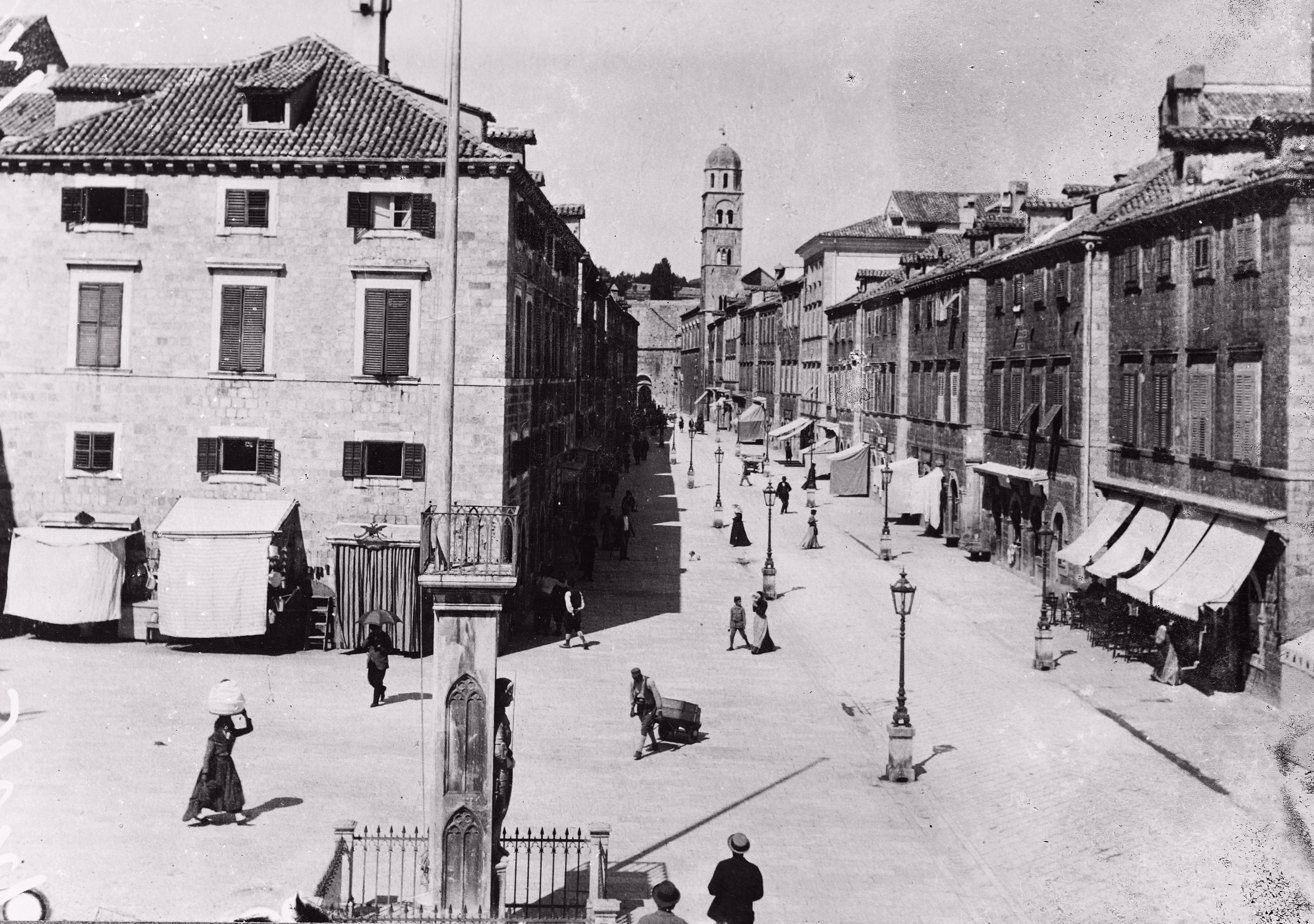
Dubrovnik's Stradun in 1910

When the Habsburg Empire annexed these provinces after the 1815 Congress of Vienna, the new authorities implemented a bureaucratic administration, established the Kingdom of Dalmatia, which had its own Sabor (Diet) or Parliament which is the oldest Croatian political institution based in the city of Zadar, and political parties such as the Autonomist Party and the People's Party. They introduced a series of modifications intended to slowly centralise the bureaucratic, tax, religious, educational, and trade structure. These steps largely failed, despite the intention of wanting to stimulate the economy. Once the personal, political and economic damage of the Napoleonic Wars had been overcome, new movements began to form in the region, calling for a political reorganisation of the Adriatic along national lines.

The combination of these two forces—a flawed Habsburg administrative system and new national movement claiming ethnicity as the founding block toward a community—posed a particularly perplexing problem: Dalmatia was a province ruled by the German-speaking Habsburg monarchy, with bilingual (Croatian- and Italian-speaking) elites that dominated the general population consisting of a Slavic Catholic majority, as well as a Slavic Orthodox minority.

In 1815, the former Dubrovnik government (its noble assembly) met for the last time in Ljetnikovac in Mokošica. Once again, extreme measures were taken to re-establish the Republic, but it was all in vain. After the fall of the Republic most of the aristocracy was recognised by the Austrian Empire.

In 1832, Baron Šišmundo Getaldić-Gundulić (Sigismondo Ghetaldi-Gondola) (1795–1860) was elected Mayor of Dubrovnik, serving for 13 years; the Austrian government granted him the title of "Baron".

Count Rafael Pucić (Raffaele Pozza) (1828–1890) was elected for first time Podestà of Dubrovnik in the year 1869 after this was re-elected in 1872, 1875, 1882, 1884) and elected twice into the Dalmatian Council, 1870, 1876. The victory of the Nationalists in Split in 1882 strongly affected in the areas of Korčula and Dubrovnik. It was greeted by the mayor (podestà) of Dubrovnik Rafael Pucić, the National Reading Club of Dubrovnik, the Workers Association of Dubrovnik and the review "Slovinac" as well as by the communities of Kuna and Orebić, the latter one getting the nationalist government even before Split.

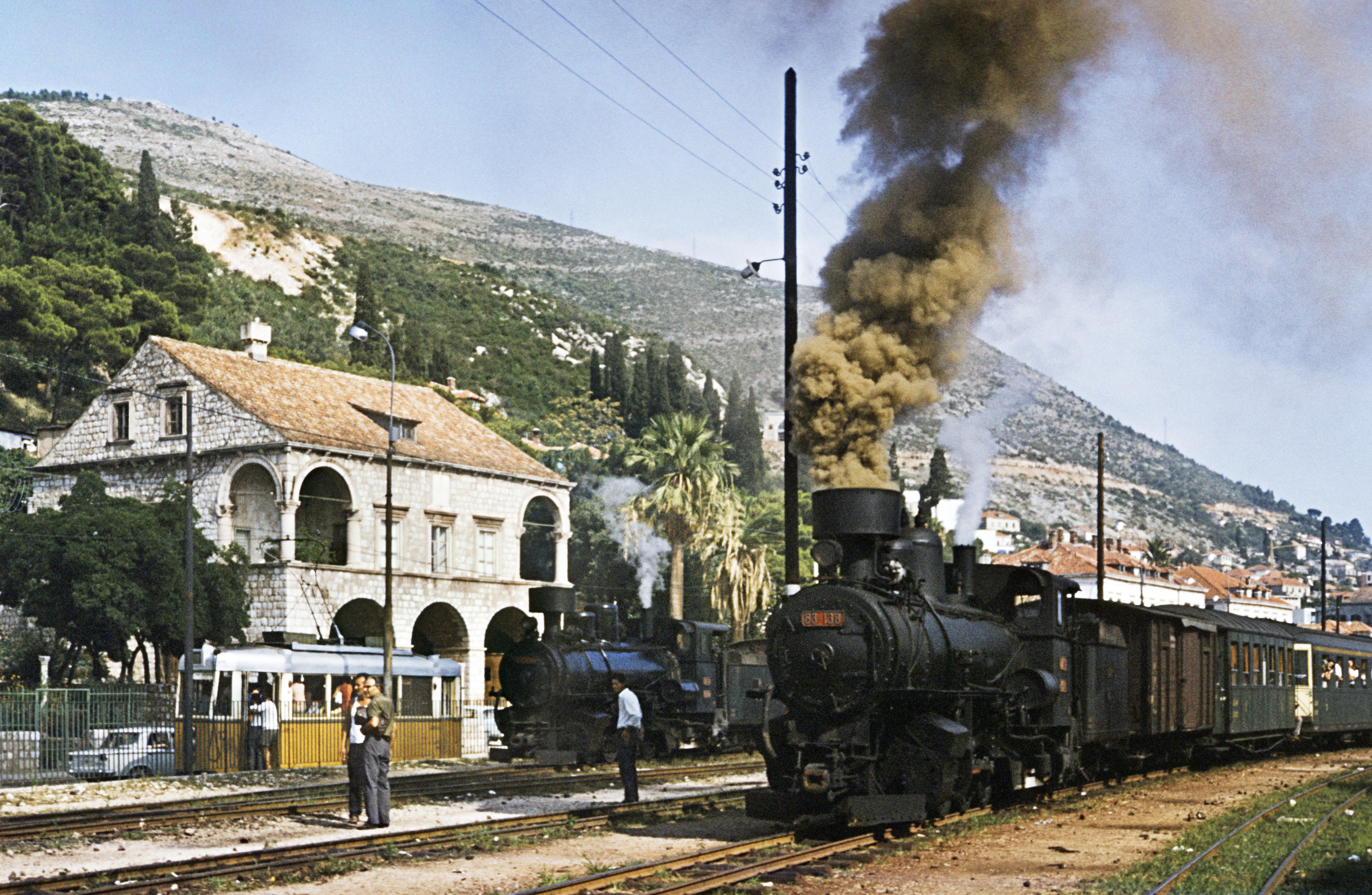
Dubrovnik railway station

In 1901, the narrow-gauge (760 mm) railway line was opened primarily to connect the port city of Dubrovnik with the interior of Bosnia and Herzegovina and further into Europe. The line was operational from 1901 to 1976.

In 1905, the committee for establishing electric tram service, headed by Luko Bunić was established. Other members of the committee were Ivo Papi, Miho Papi, Artur Saraka, Mato Šarić, Antun Pugliesi, Mato Gracić, Ivo Degiulli, Ernest Katić and Antun Milić. The tram service in Dubrovnik existed from 1910 to 1970.

Pero Čingrija (1837–1921), one of the leaders of the People's Party in Dalmatia, played the main role in the merger of the People's Party and the Party of Right into a single Croatian Party in 1905.

=== Yugoslav period (1918–1991) ===
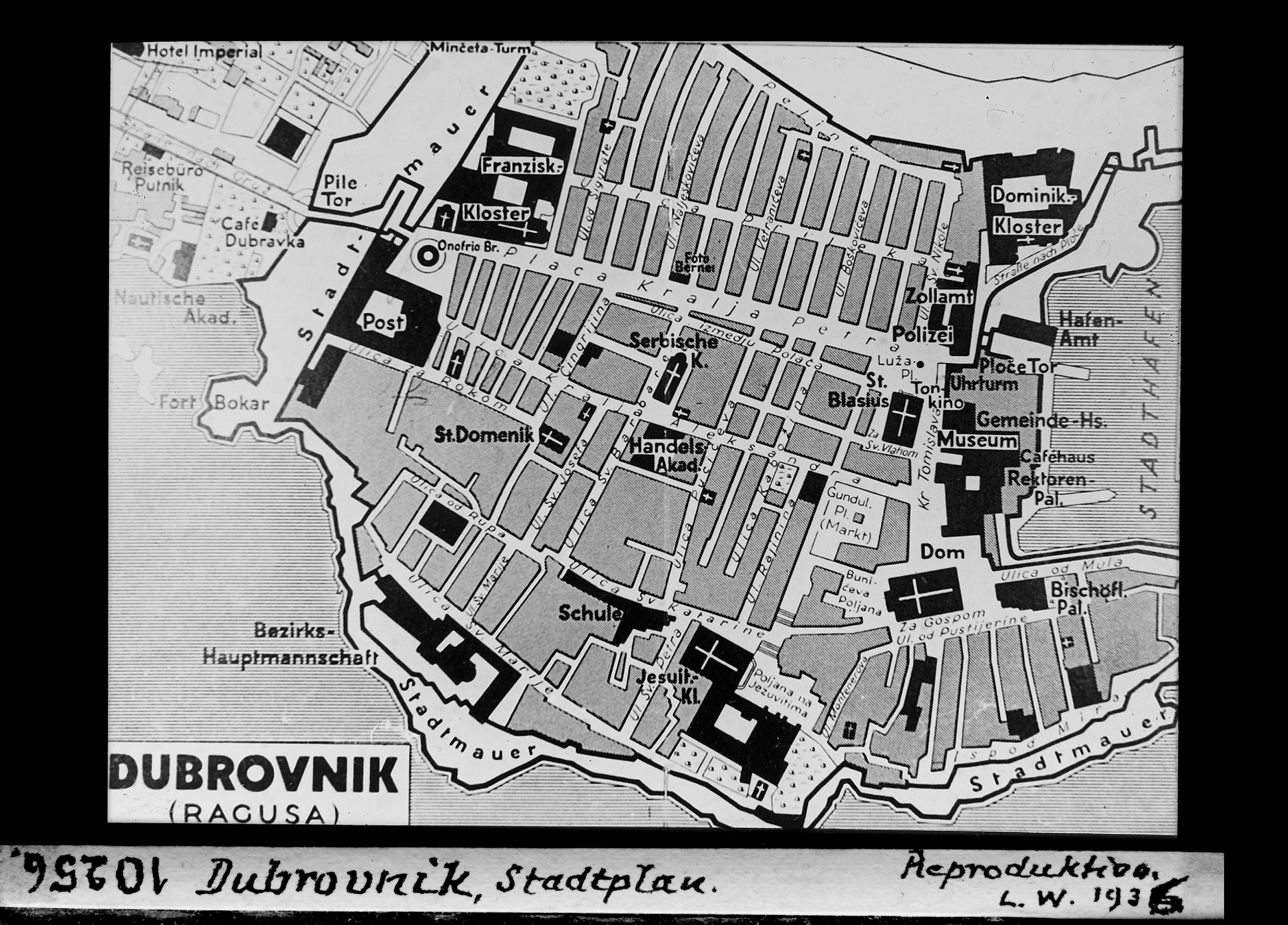
City plan of Dubrovnik in 1930s

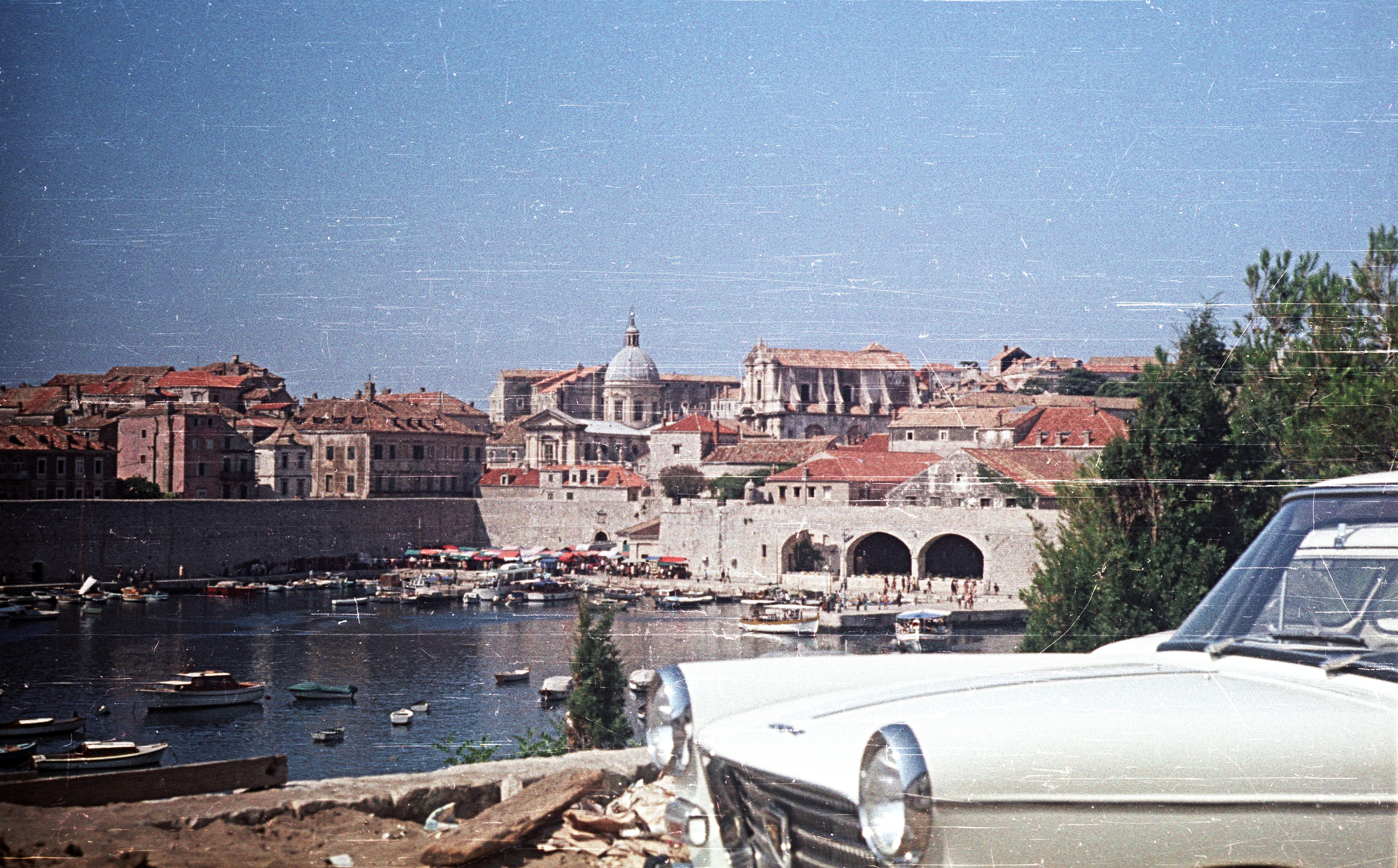
Port of Dubrovnik in 1965

With the fall of Austria-Hungary in 1918, the city was incorporated into the new Kingdom of Serbs, Croats, and Slovenes (later renamed to Kingdom of Yugoslavia). Dubrovnik became one of the 33 oblasts of the Kingdom. When Yugoslavia was divided among nine banovinas in 1929, the city became part of the Zeta Banovina. In 1939, Dubrovnik became part of the newly created Banovina of Croatia.

During the World War II in Yugoslavia, Dubrovnik became part of the Axis puppet state, Independent State of Croatia (NDH), occupied by the Italian Army first, and by the German Army after 8 September 1943. There were clashes between Italian and German troops in Dubrovnik when the Germans took over. In October 1944, Yugoslav Partisans liberated Dubrovnik, arresting more than 300 citizens and executing 53 without trial; this event came to be known, after the small island on which it occurred, as the Daksa executions. Communist leadership during the next several years continued political prosecutions, which culminated on 12 April 1947 with the capture and imprisonment of more than 90 citizens of Dubrovnik. After the war the remaining members of Dalmatian Italians of Dubrovnik left Yugoslavia towards Italy (Istrian-Dalmatian exodus).

Under communism Dubrovnik became part of SR Croatia within SFR Yugoslavia. After the World War II, the city started to attract crowds of tourists–even more after 1979, when the city joined the UNESCO list of World Heritage Sites. The growth of tourism also led to the decision to demilitarise the Dubrovnik Old Town. The income from tourism was pivotal in the post-war development of the city, including its airport. The Dubrovnik Summer Festival was founded in 1950. The Adriatic Highway (Magistrala) was opened in 1965 after a decade of works, connecting Dubrovnik with Rijeka along the whole coastline, and giving a boost to the tourist development of the Croatian Riviera.

=== Siege of Dubrovnik and its consequences ===
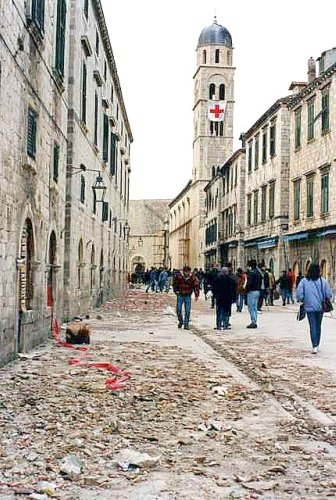
Stradun shelled during the Siege of Dubrovnik (1991)

In 1991, Croatia and Slovenia, which at that time were republics within SFR Yugoslavia, declared their independence. The Socialist Republic of Croatia was renamed as the Republic of Croatia.

Despite the demilitarisation of the Old Town in early 1970s in an attempt to prevent it from ever becoming a casualty of war, following Croatia's independence in 1991, Yugoslav People's Army (JNA)–by then composed primarily of Serbs–attacked the city. The new Croatian government set up a military outpost in the city itself. Montenegro–led by President Momir Bulatović and Prime Minister Milo Đukanović, who came to power in the Anti-bureaucratic revolution and were allied to Slobodan Milošević in Serbia–declared that Dubrovnik should not remain in Croatia. At the time most residents of Dubrovnik had come to identify as Croatian, with Serbs accounting for 6.8 percent of the population.

On 1 October 1991, Dubrovnik was attacked by the JNA resulting in a siege that lasted for seven months. The heaviest artillery attack was on 6 December with 19 people killed and 60 wounded. The number of casualties in the conflict, according to the Croatian Red Cross, was 114 killed civilians, among them poet Milan Milišić. Foreign newspapers were criticised for placing heavier attention on the damage suffered by the Old Town than on human casualties. Nonetheless, the artillery attacks on Dubrovnik damaged 56% of its buildings to some degree, as the historic walled city, a UNESCO World Heritage Site, sustained 650 hits by artillery rounds. The Croatian Army lifted the siege in May 1992, and liberated Dubrovnik's surroundings by the end of October, but the danger of sudden attacks by the JNA lasted for another three years.

Following the end of the war, damage caused by the shelling of the Old Town was repaired. Adhering to UNESCO guidelines, repairs were performed in the original style. Most of the reconstruction work was done between 1995 and 1999. The inflicted damage can be seen on a chart near the city gate, showing all artillery hits during the siege, and is clearly visible from high points around the city in the form of the more brightly coloured new roofs.

The International Criminal Tribunal for the former Yugoslavia (ICTY) issued indictments for JNA generals and officers involved in the bombing. General Pavle Strugar, who coordinated the attack on the city, was sentenced to a seven-and-a-half-year prison term by the tribunal for his role in the attack.

=== Post-war Dubrovnik in Republic of Croatia ===
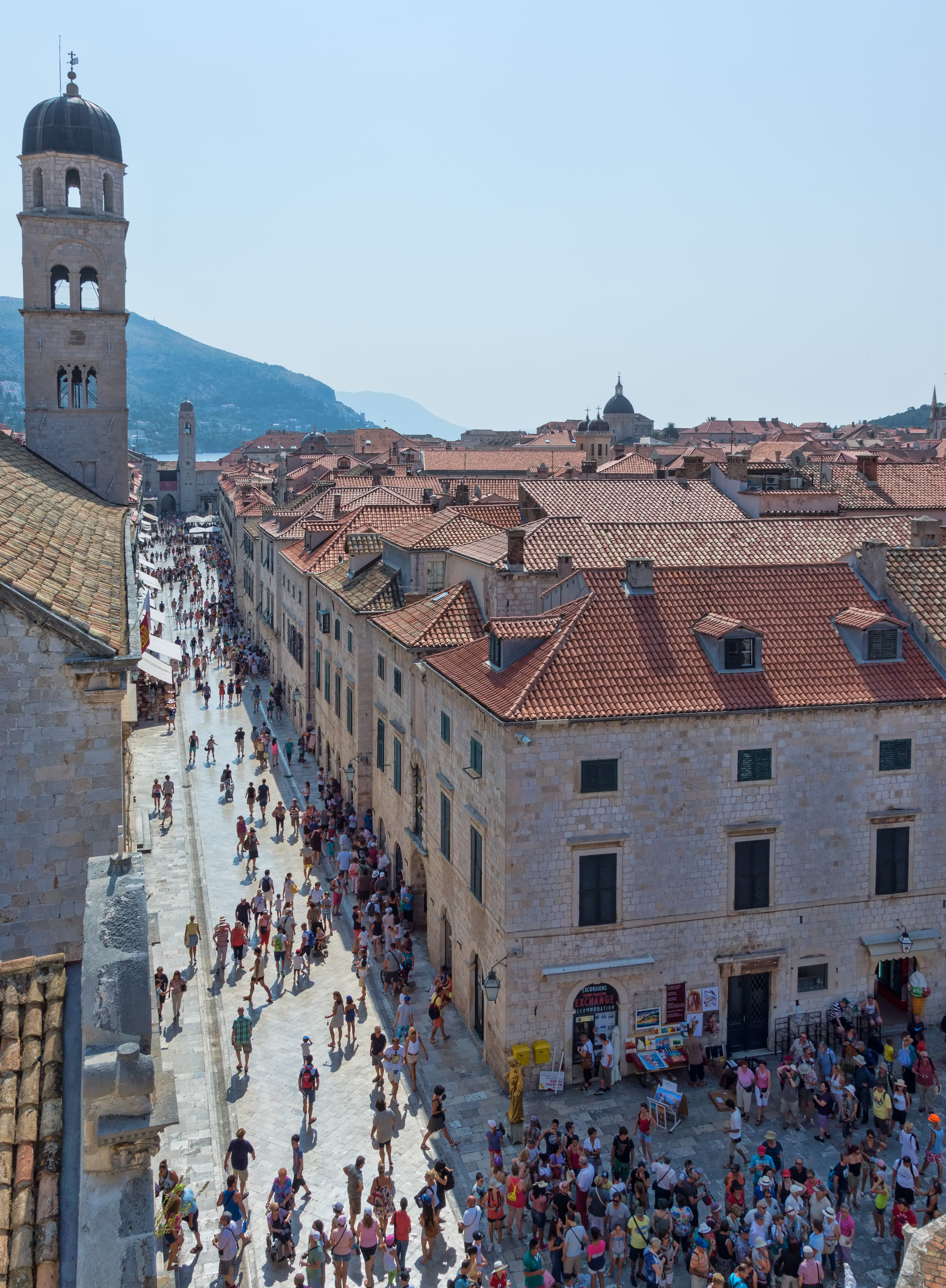
Stradun in Dubrovnik during summer

After the Croatian War of Independence in the 1990s, Dubrovnik entered a major period of reconstruction which continued throughout the 1990s with support from Croatia and UNESCO. In 1998, Dubrovnik was removed from UNESCO’s List of World Heritage in Danger. In 1996 USAF CT-43 crash happened, near Dubrovnik Airport, killed everyone on a United States Air Force jet, including United States Secretary of Commerce Ron Brown, The New York Times Frankfurt Bureau chief Nathaniel C. Nash, and 33 other people.

In the following decades, Dubrovnik developed into an important international tourist, cultural, and congress destination, hosting political leaders, diplomats, international organizations, and European and international summits, including the Three Seas Initiative and Croatia Forum. The city also became an increasingly popular film destination, featuring in numerous international productions, most famously Game of Thrones, Star Wars: The Last Jedi, The Dark Side of the Sun, and Robin Hood. Events such as the tennis tournament Dubrovnik Open further contributed to its international profile. Today, Dubrovnik combines its historic heritage with tourism, film, culture, diplomacy, and international events, reinforcing its status as one of Croatia’s most recognizable cities. Dubrovnik’s growing popularity has also led to concerns about overtourism. Large visitor numbers, especially during summer and cruise ship arrivals, put pressure on the city’s infrastructure, housing, and historic Old Town, creating challenges for sustainable tourism.

In October 2023, Dubrovnik joined the European Network of Saint James Way Paths, with a 147-kilometer pilgrimage route "Camino Dubrovnik-Međugorje", expected to be open to visitors in May 2024.

== Geography ==
Dubrovnik is located in the southern tip of the Dalmatia region of Croatia in the Adriatic Sea. It is part of the Dubrovnik-Neretva County and borders the municipality of Dubrovačko Primorje to the north, more specifically the Majkovi village.

=== Islands ===
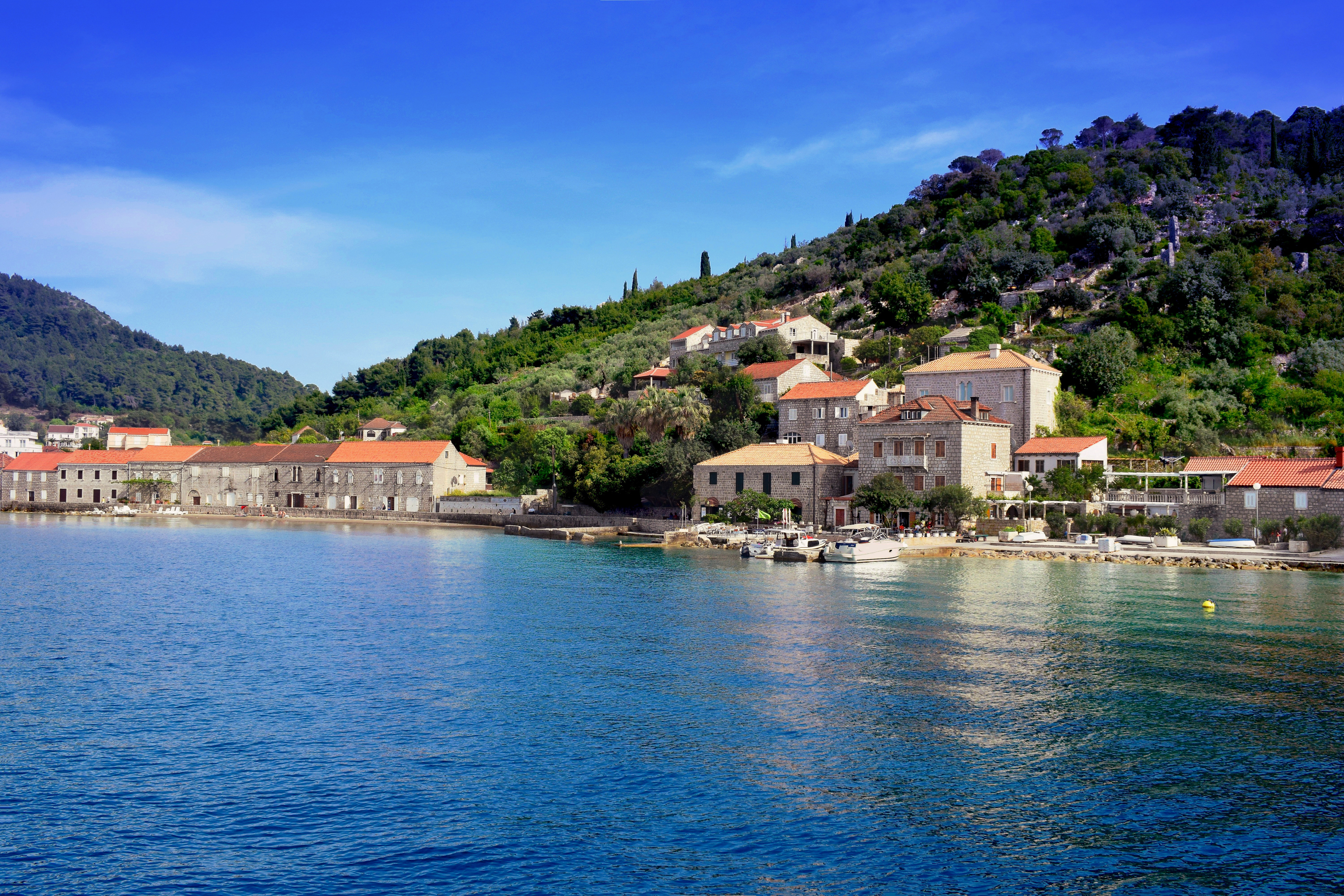
Lopud Island

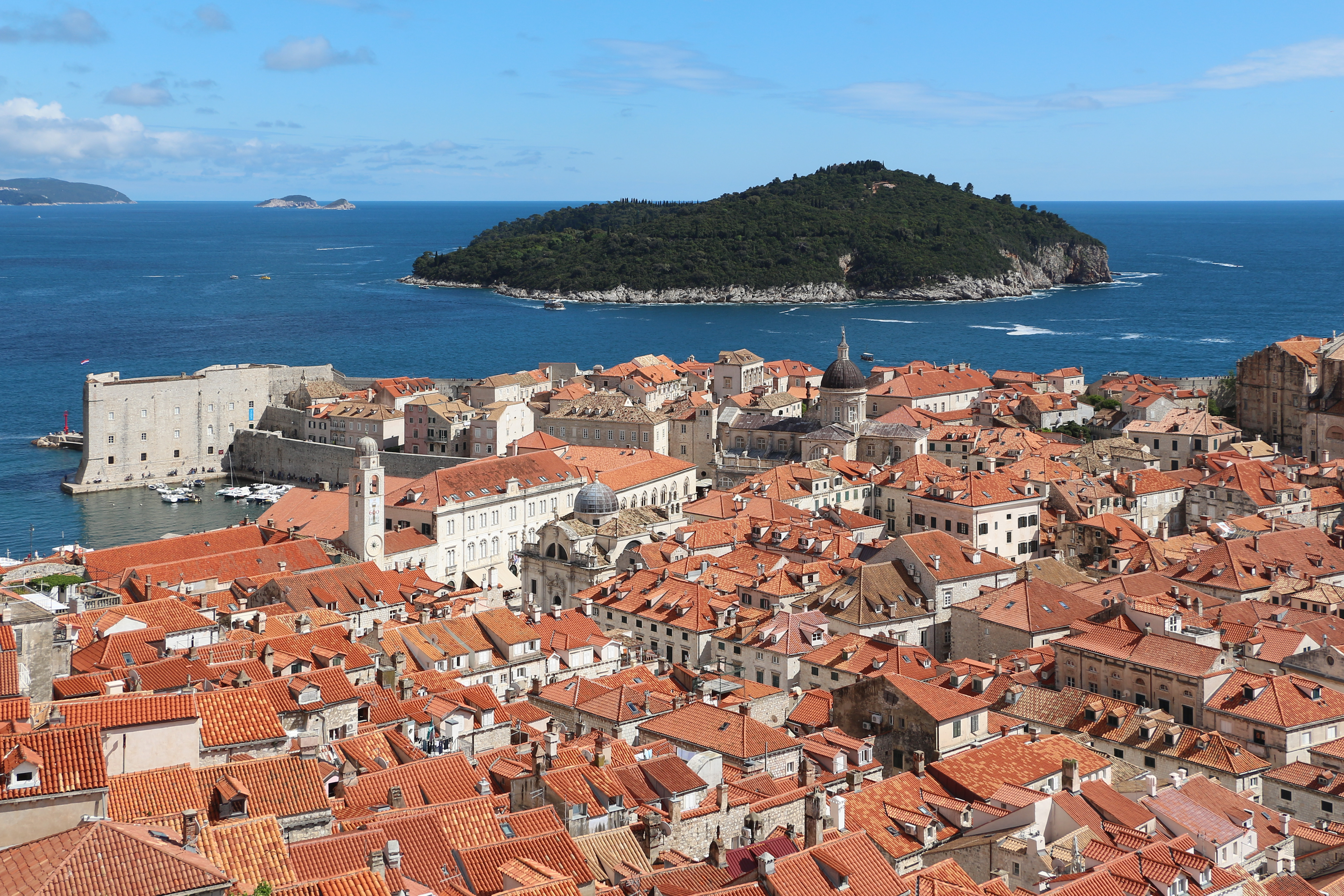
Lokrum island behind Dubrovnik's old town

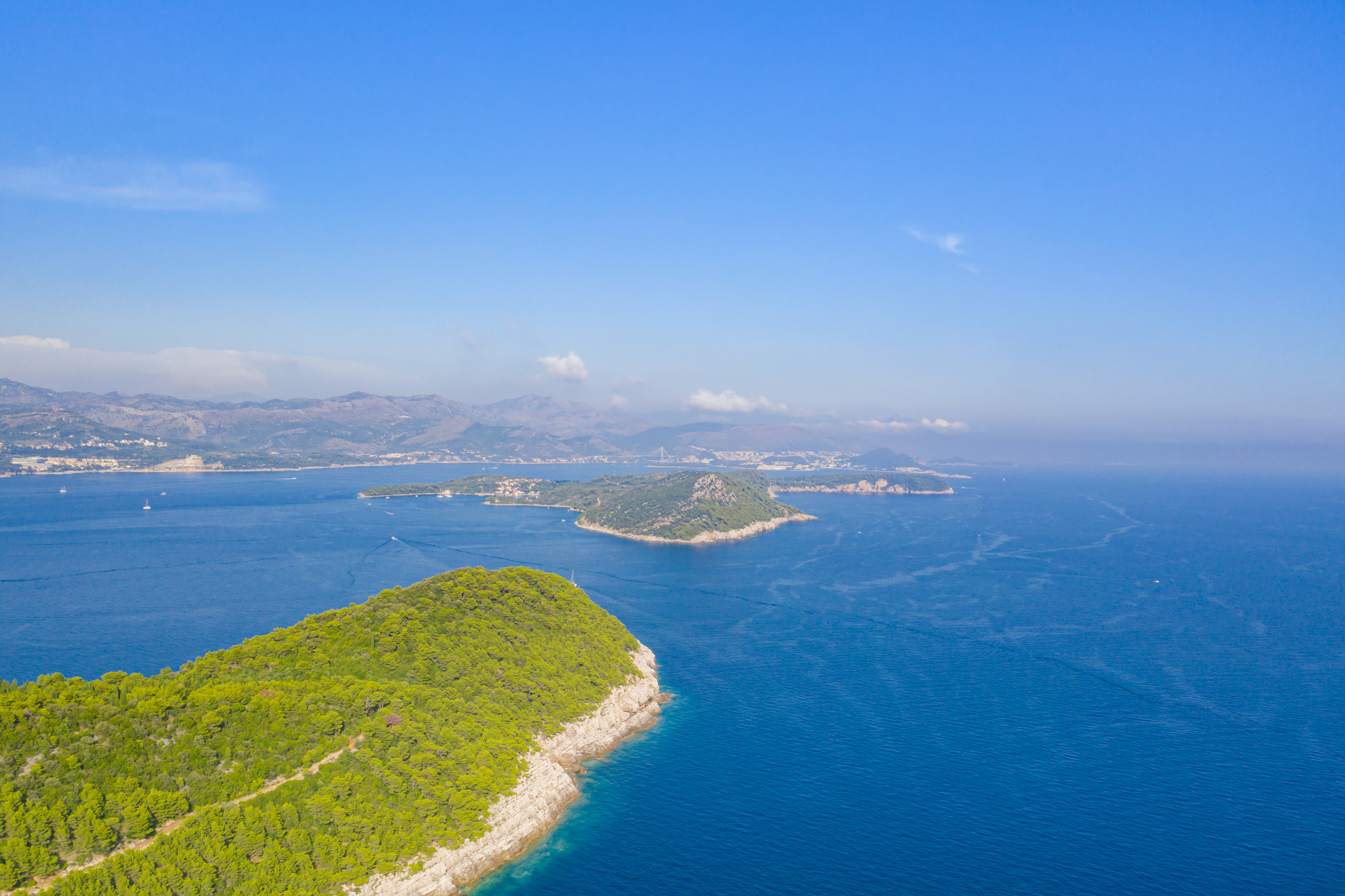
Koločep island

There are several islands (part of the Elaphiti Islands archipelago) off the coast of Dubrovnik, including from north to south (the islands in bold are larger and populated, and most of the others are uninhabited):

- Olipa
- Tajan
- Mišnjak
- Jakljan
- **Šipan**
- Crkvina
- Kosmeč
- Ruda
- **Lopud**
- **Koločep**
- Daksa
- Grebeni
- Sveti Andrija

Another island disputedly part of the Elaphiti Islands is:

- Lokrum

=== Climate ===
Dubrovnik has a hot-summer Mediterranean climate (Köppen climate classification: Csa), that is bordering closely on a humid subtropical climate (Köppen climate classification: Cfa). Dubrovnik has hot, muggy, relatively dry summers and mild to cool wet winters. The bora wind blows cold gusts down the Adriatic coast between October and April, and thundery conditions are common year round, even in summer, when they interrupt the warm, sunny days. The air temperatures can slightly vary, depending on the area or region. Typically, in July and August daytime maximum temperatures reach 28 °C (82 °F), and at night drop to approximately 23 °C (73 °F). In spring and autumn, maximum temperatures are typically between 20 °C (68 °F) and 28 °C (82 °F). Dubrovnik has the mildest winters of any Croatian city, with daytime temperatures around 13 °C (55 °F) in the coldest months. Snow in Dubrovnik is very rare.

Since records began in 1961, the highest temperature recorded at the local weather station at an elevation of 52 metres (171 ft) was 38.9 °C (102.0 °F), on 13 August 2025. The coldest temperature was −7.0 °C (19.4 °F), on 14 January 1968.

Climate data for Dubrovnik (1971–2000, extremes 1961–2019)
Month	Jan	Feb	Mar	Apr	May	Jun	Jul	Aug	Sep	Oct	Nov	Dec	Year
Record high °C (°F)	18.4 (65.1)	24.1 (75.4)	26.8 (80.2)	30.3 (86.5)	32.9 (91.2)	37.5 (99.5)	37.9 (100.2)	38.9 (102.0)	34.8 (94.6)	30.5 (86.9)	25.4 (77.7)	20.4 (68.7)	38.9 (102.0)
Mean daily maximum °C (°F)	12.3 (54.1)	12.6 (54.7)	14.4 (57.9)	16.9 (62.4)	21.5 (70.7)	25.3 (77.5)	28.2 (82.8)	28.5 (83.3)	25.1 (77.2)	21.1 (70.0)	16.6 (61.9)	13.4 (56.1)	19.7 (67.5)
Daily mean °C (°F)	9.2 (48.6)	9.4 (48.9)	11.1 (52.0)	13.8 (56.8)	18.3 (64.9)	22.0 (71.6)	24.6 (76.3)	24.8 (76.6)	21.4 (70.5)	17.6 (63.7)	13.3 (55.9)	10.3 (50.5)	16.3 (61.3)
Mean daily minimum °C (°F)	6.6 (43.9)	6.8 (44.2)	8.4 (47.1)	11.0 (51.8)	15.3 (59.5)	18.9 (66.0)	21.4 (70.5)	21.6 (70.9)	18.4 (65.1)	14.9 (58.8)	10.7 (51.3)	7.8 (46.0)	13.5 (56.3)
Record low °C (°F)	−7.0 (19.4)	−5.2 (22.6)	−4.2 (24.4)	1.6 (34.9)	5.2 (41.4)	10.0 (50.0)	14.1 (57.4)	14.1 (57.4)	8.5 (47.3)	4.5 (40.1)	−1.0 (30.2)	−6.0 (21.2)	−7.0 (19.4)
Average precipitation mm (inches)	98.3 (3.87)	97.9 (3.85)	93.1 (3.67)	91.4 (3.60)	70.1 (2.76)	44.0 (1.73)	28.3 (1.11)	72.5 (2.85)	86.1 (3.39)	120.1 (4.73)	142.3 (5.60)	119.8 (4.72)	1,064 (41.89)
Average precipitation days (≥ 0.1 mm)	11.2	11.2	11.2	12.0	9.4	6.4	4.7	5.1	7.2	10.8	12.4	12.0	113.6
Average relative humidity (%)	59.9	58.4	61.2	64.2	66.7	63.8	58.2	59.2	61.9	62.2	62.4	60.3	61.5
Mean monthly sunshine hours	130.2	142.8	179.8	207.0	266.6	312.0	347.2	325.5	309.0	189.1	135.0	124.0	2,668.2
Source: Croatian Meteorological and Hydrological Service

Climate data for Dubrovnik
Month	Jan	Feb	Mar	Apr	May	Jun	Jul	Aug	Sep	Oct	Nov	Dec	Year
Average sea temperature °C (°F)	14.1 (57.4)	14.2 (57.6)	14.4 (57.9)	15.6 (60.1)	18.7 (65.7)	23.1 (73.6)	25.5 (77.9)	25.4 (77.7)	24.3 (75.7)	20.7 (69.3)	18.2 (64.8)	15.7 (60.3)	19.2 (66.5)
Mean daily daylight hours	9.0	11.0	12.0	13.0	15.0	15.0	15.0	14.0	12.0	11.0	10.0	9.0	12.2
Average Ultraviolet index	1	2	4	5	7	8	9	8	6	4	2	1	4.8
Source: Weather Atlas

== Heritage ==
Old City of Dubrovnik
- Stari grad Dubrovnik (Croatian)
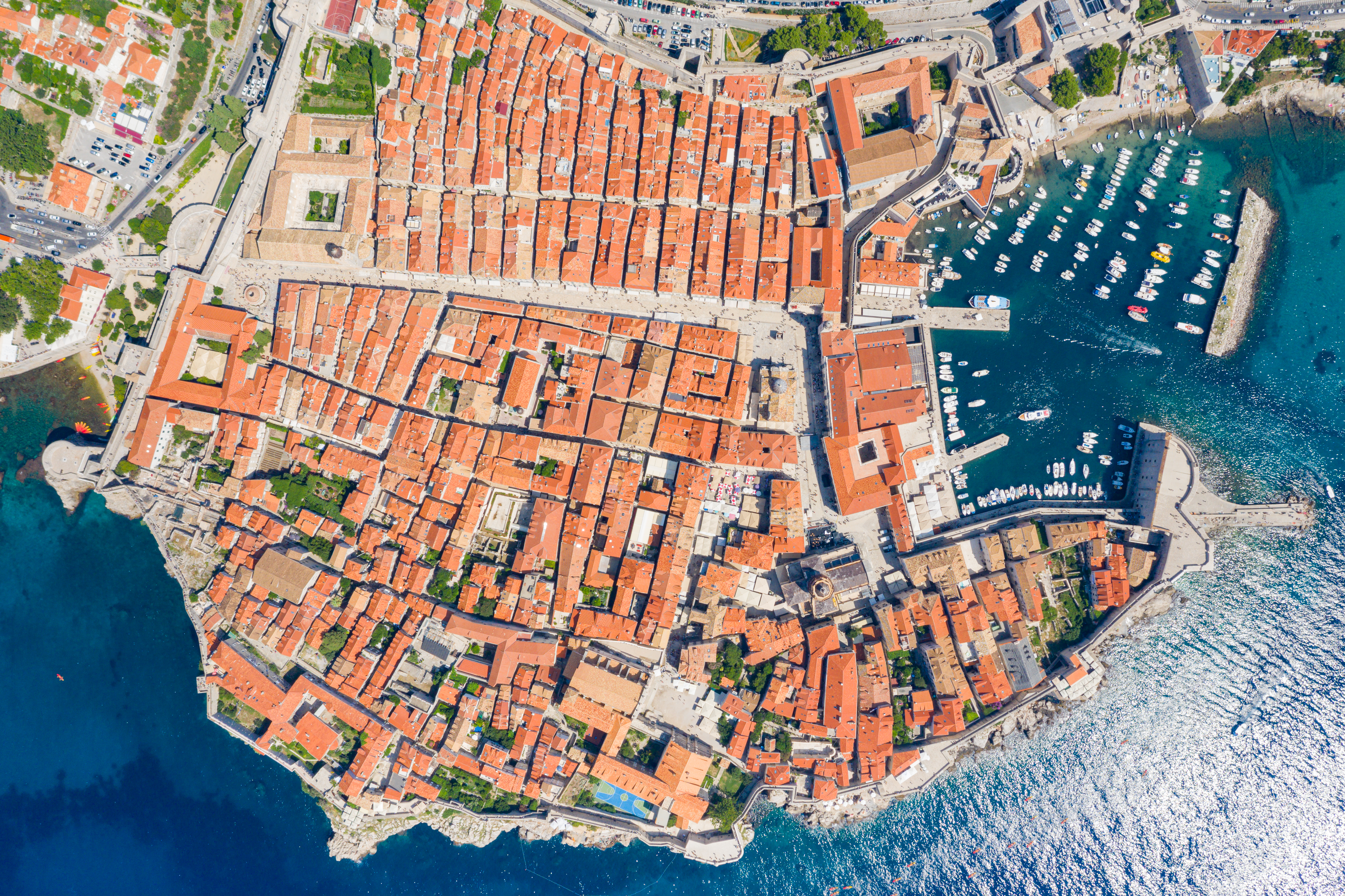
- Top-down aerial view of old town Dubrovnik
- Interactive map of Old City of Dubrovnik
- 42.6408°N 18.1100°E
- Location: Dubrovnik-Neretva County, Croatia

UNESCO World Heritage Site
- Type: Cultural
- Criteria: i, iii, iv
- Designated: 1979 (3rd Session)
- Reference no.: 95
- Europe and North America
- Extension: 1994
- Endangered: 1991–1998

Cultural Good of Croatia
- Official name: Stari grad Dubrovnik

The annual Dubrovnik Summer Festival is a 45-day-long cultural event with live plays, concerts and games. It has been awarded a Gold International Trophy for Quality (2007) by the Editorial Office in collaboration with the Trade Leaders Club.

The patron saint of the city is Sveti Vlaho (Saint Blaise), whose statues are seen around the city. He has an importance similar to that of St. Mark the Evangelist to Venice. One of the larger churches in the city is named after Saint Blaise. February 3 is the feast of Sveti Vlaho. Every year the city of Dubrovnik celebrates the holiday with Mass, parades, and festivities that last for several days.

The Old Town of Dubrovnik is depicted on the reverse of the Croatian 50 kuna banknote, issued in 1993 and 2002.

The city boasts many old buildings, such as the Arboretum Trsteno in Trsteno, the oldest arboretum in the world, which dates back to before 1492. Also, the third-oldest European pharmacy and the oldest still in operation, having been founded in 1317, is in Dubrovnik, at the Franciscan monastery.

In history, many Conversos (Marranos) were attracted to Dubrovnik, formerly a considerable seaport. In May 1544, a ship landed there filled exclusively with Portuguese refugees, as Balthasar de Faria reported to King John. Another admirer of Dubrovnik, George Bernard Shaw, visited the city in 1929 and said: "If you want to see heaven on earth, come to Dubrovnik."

In the bay of Dubrovnik is the 72-hectare (180-acre) wooded island of Lokrum, where according to legend, Richard the Lionheart, King of England, was cast ashore after being shipwrecked in 1192. The island includes a fortress, botanical garden, monastery and naturist beach.

Among the many tourist destinations are a few beaches. Banje, Dubrovnik's main public beach, is home to the Eastwest Beach Club. There is also Copacabana Beach, a stony beach on the Lapad peninsula, named after the popular beach in Rio de Janeiro.

By 2018, the city had to take steps to reduce the excessive number of tourists, especially in the Old Town. One method to moderate the overcrowding was to stagger the arrival/departure times of cruise ships to spread the number of visitors more evenly during the week. In 2023, Dubrovnik's mayor closed the terrace of a bar in Stradun for the nuisance it created for the neighborhood and announced a ban on wheeled luggage in the old town to limit noise on paved streets of the Old Town.

=== Important monuments ===
Tourists sitting on Jesuit Stairs with Collegium Ragusinum atop the stairs.

Few of Dubrovnik's Renaissance buildings survived the earthquake of 1667 but enough remained to give an idea of the city's architectural heritage. The finest Renaissance highlight is the Sponza Palace which dates from the 16th century and is currently used to house the National Archives. The Rector's Palace is a Gothic-Renaissance structure that displays finely carved capitals and an ornate staircase. It now houses a museum. Its façade is depicted on the reverse of the Croatian 50 kuna banknote, issued in 1993 and 2002. The St. Saviour Church is another remnant of the Renaissance period, next to the much-visited Franciscan Church and Monastery. The Franciscan monastery's library possesses 30,000 volumes, 216 incunabula, and 1,500 valuable handwritten documents. Exhibits include a 15th-century silver-gilt cross and silver thurible, an 18th-century crucifix from Jerusalem, a martyrology (1541) by Bernardin Gučetić and illuminated psalters.

St Blaise's church was built in the 18th century in honour of Dubrovnik's patron saint. The baroque Dubrovnik Cathedral was built in the 18th century and houses relics of Saint Blaise. The city's Dominican Monastery resembles a fortress on the outside and the interior contains an art museum and a Gothic-Romanesque church. The Dominican monastery has a library with 216 incunabula, illustrated manuscripts, an archive and an art collection.

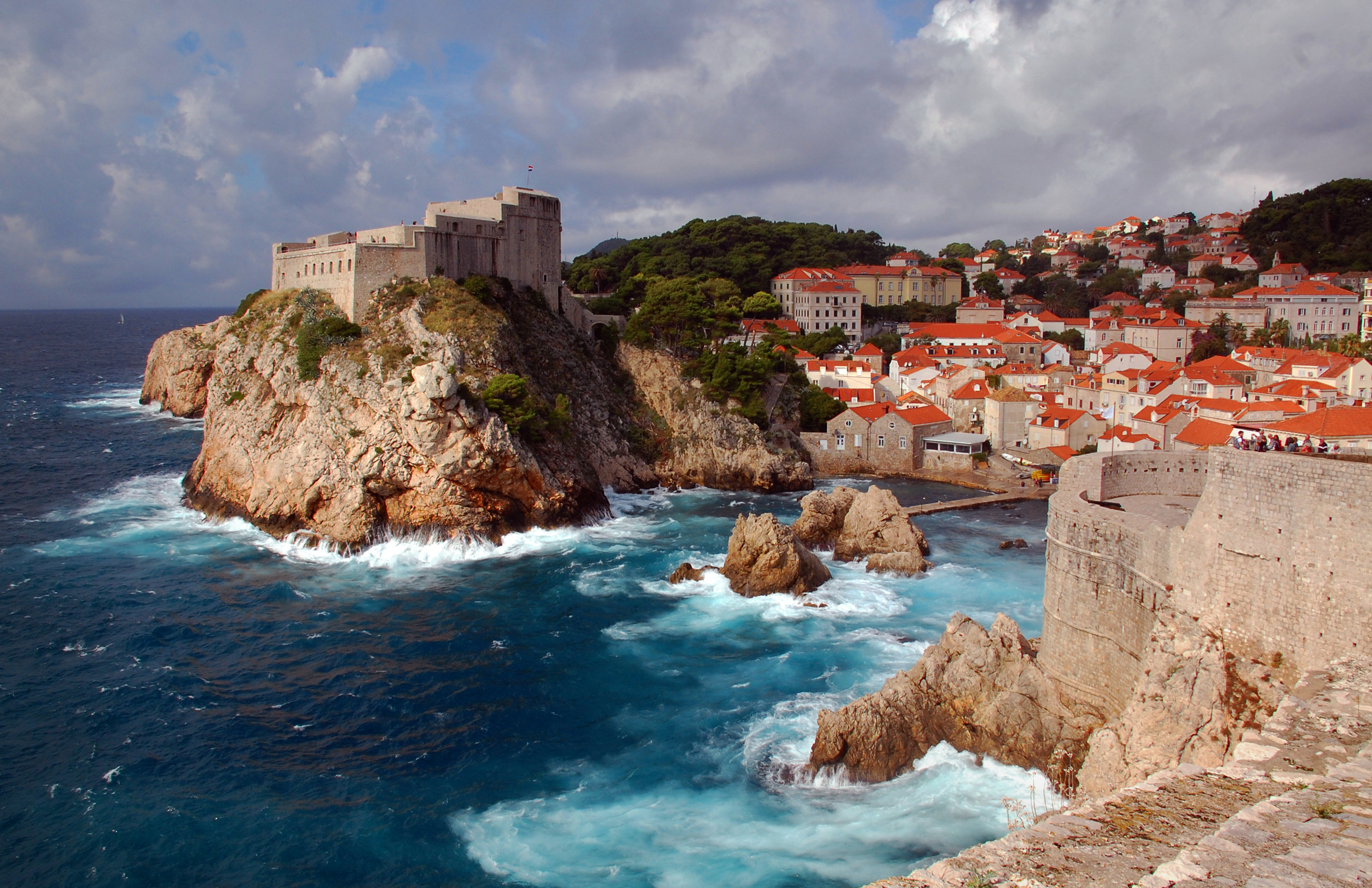
Lovrijenac and Bokar fortifications

The Neapolitan architect and engineer Onofrio della Cava completed the aqueduct with two public fountains, both built in 1438. Close to the Pile Gate stands the Big Onofrio's Fountain in the middle of a small square. It may have been inspired by the former Romanesque baptistry of the former cathedral in Bunić Square. The sculptural elements were lost in the earthquake of 1667. Water jets gush out of the mouth of the sixteen mascarons. The Little Onofrio's Fountain stands at the eastern side of the Placa, supplying water to the market place in the Luža Square. The sculptures were made by the Milanese artist Pietro di Martino (who also sculpted the ornaments in the Rector's Palace and made a statue – now lost – for the Franciscan church).

St. Saviour Church (left) and Franciscan church and Monastery (centre) with Big Onofrio's Fountain (left)

The 31-metre-high (102 ft) Dubrovnik Bell Tower, built in 1444, is one of the symbols of the free city state of Ragusa. It was built by the local architects Grubačević, Utišenović and Radončić. It was rebuilt in 1929 as it had lost its stability through an earthquake and was in danger of falling. The brass face of the clock shows the phases of the moon. Two human figures strike the bell every hour. The tower stands next to the House of the Main Guard, also built in Gothic style. It was the residence of the admiral, commander-in-chief of the army. The Baroque portal was built between 1706 and 1708 by the Venetian architect Marino Gropelli (who also built St Blaise's church).

In 1418, the Republic of Ragusa, as Dubrovnik was then named, erected a statue of Roland (Ital. Orlando) as a symbol of loyalty to Sigismund of Luxembourg (1368–1437), King of Hungary and Croatia (as of 1387), Prince-Elector of Brandenburg (between 1378 and 1388 and again between 1411 and 1415), German King (as of 1411), King of Bohemia (as of 1419) and Emperor of the Holy Roman Empire (as of 1433), who helped by a successful war alliance against Venice to retain Ragusa's independence. It stands in the middle of Luža Square. Roland statues were typical symbols of city autonomy or independence, often erected under Sigismund in his Electorate of Brandenburg. In 1419 the sculptor Bonino of Milano, with the help of local craftsmen, replaced the first Roland with the present Gothic statue. Its forearm was for a long time the unit of measure in Dubrovnik: one ell of Dubrovnik is equal to 51.2 cm (20.2 in).

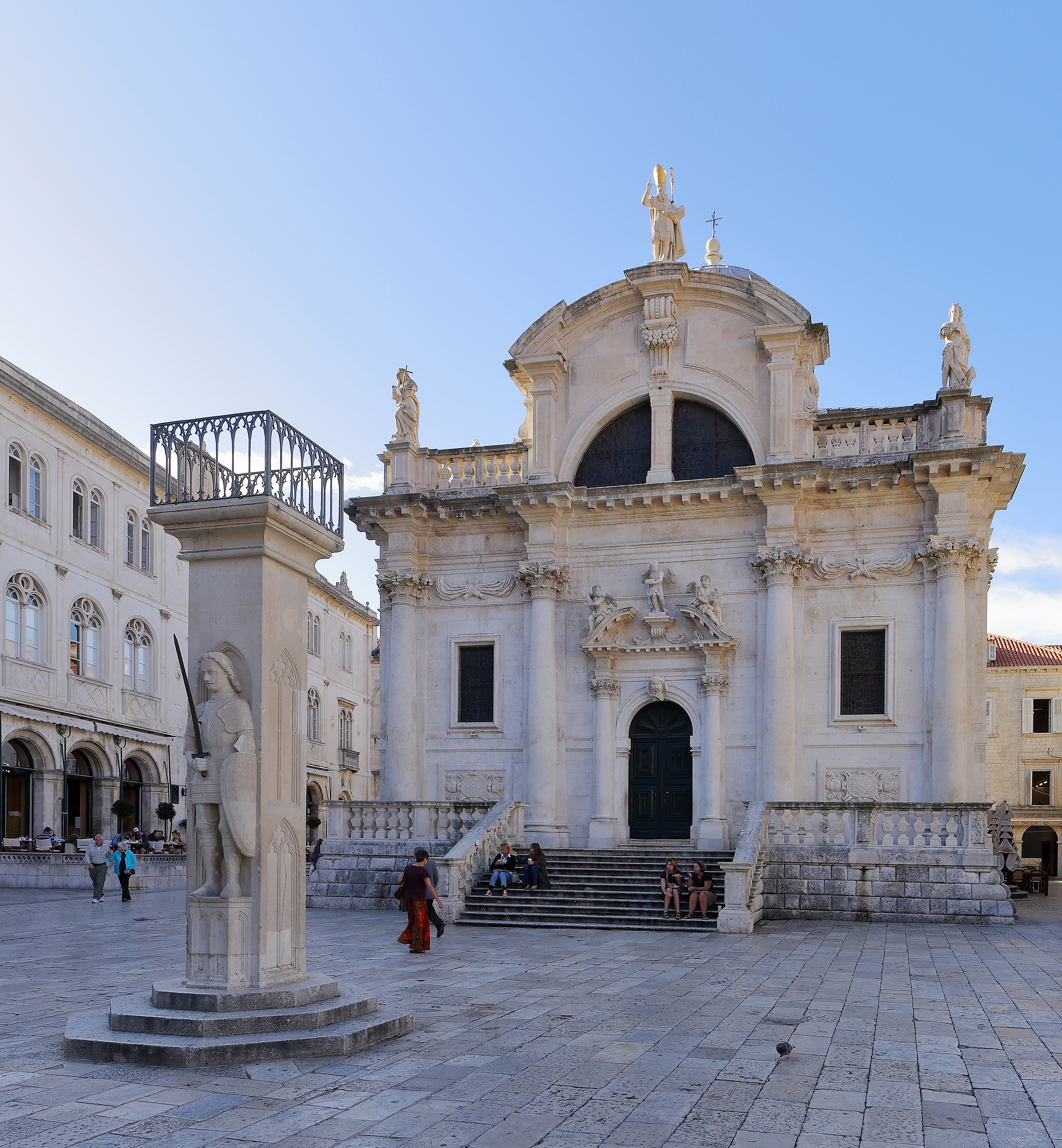
Saint Blaise's Church

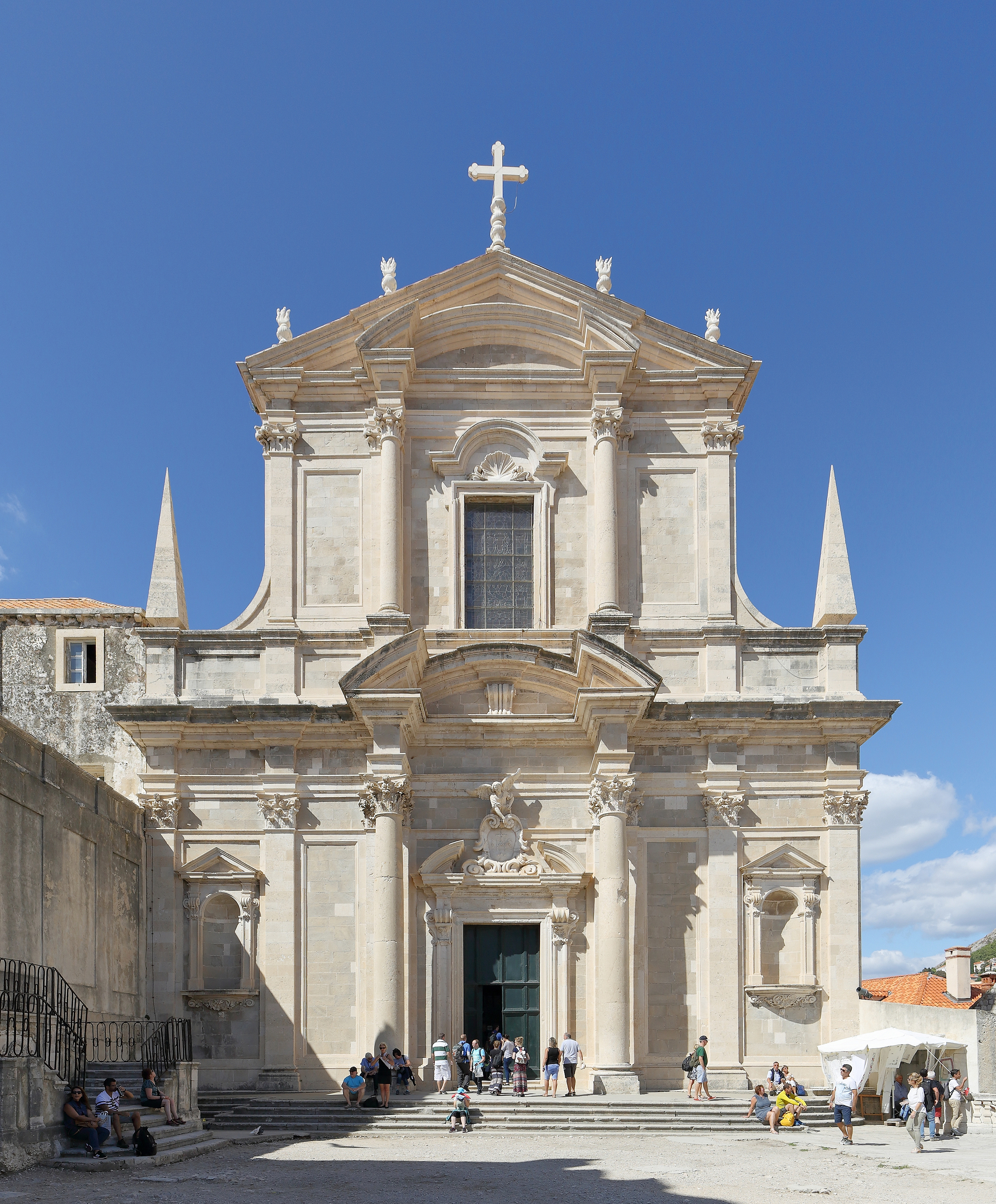
Saint Ignatius Church, part of former Jesuit Collegium Ragusinum

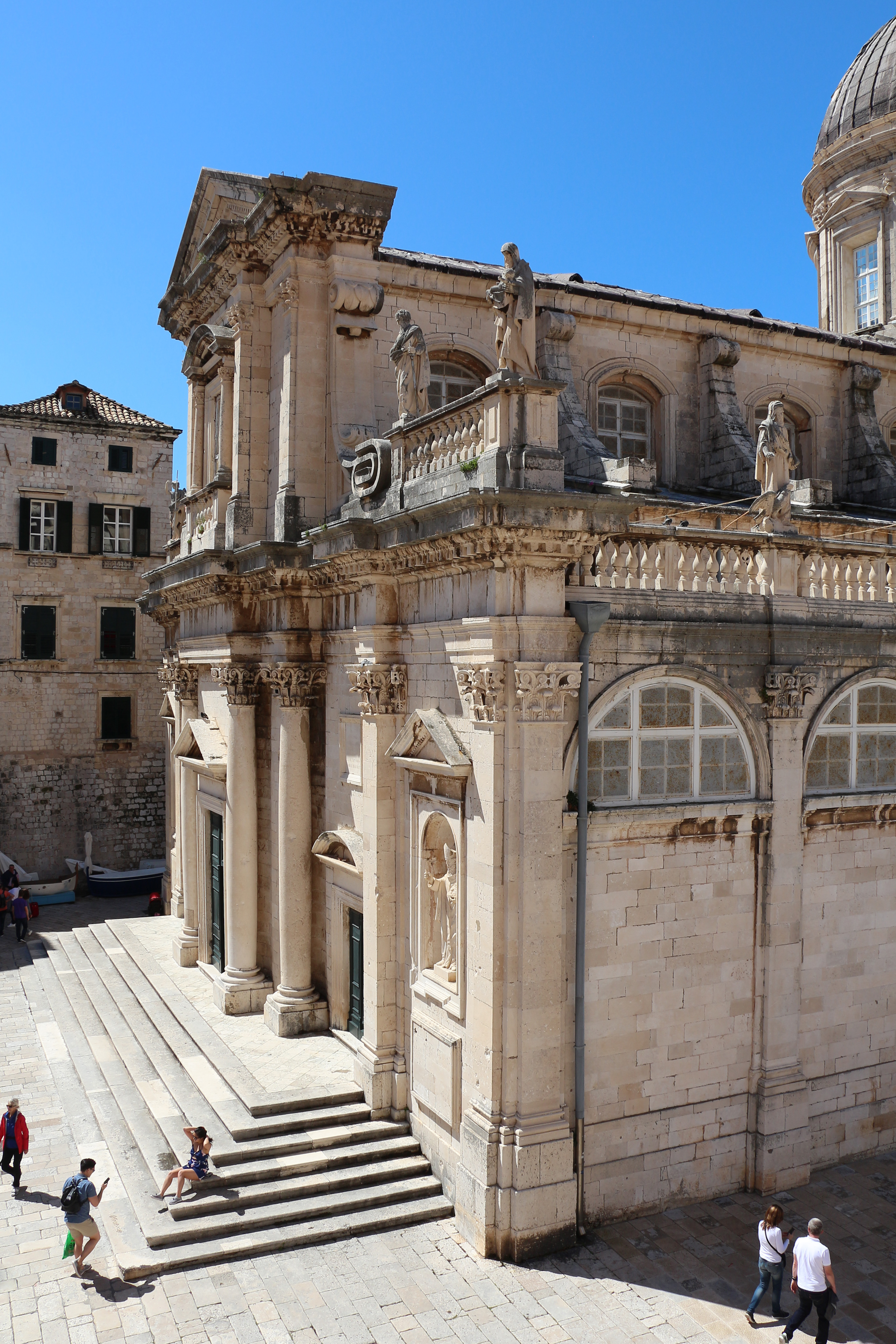
Cathedral of the Assumption

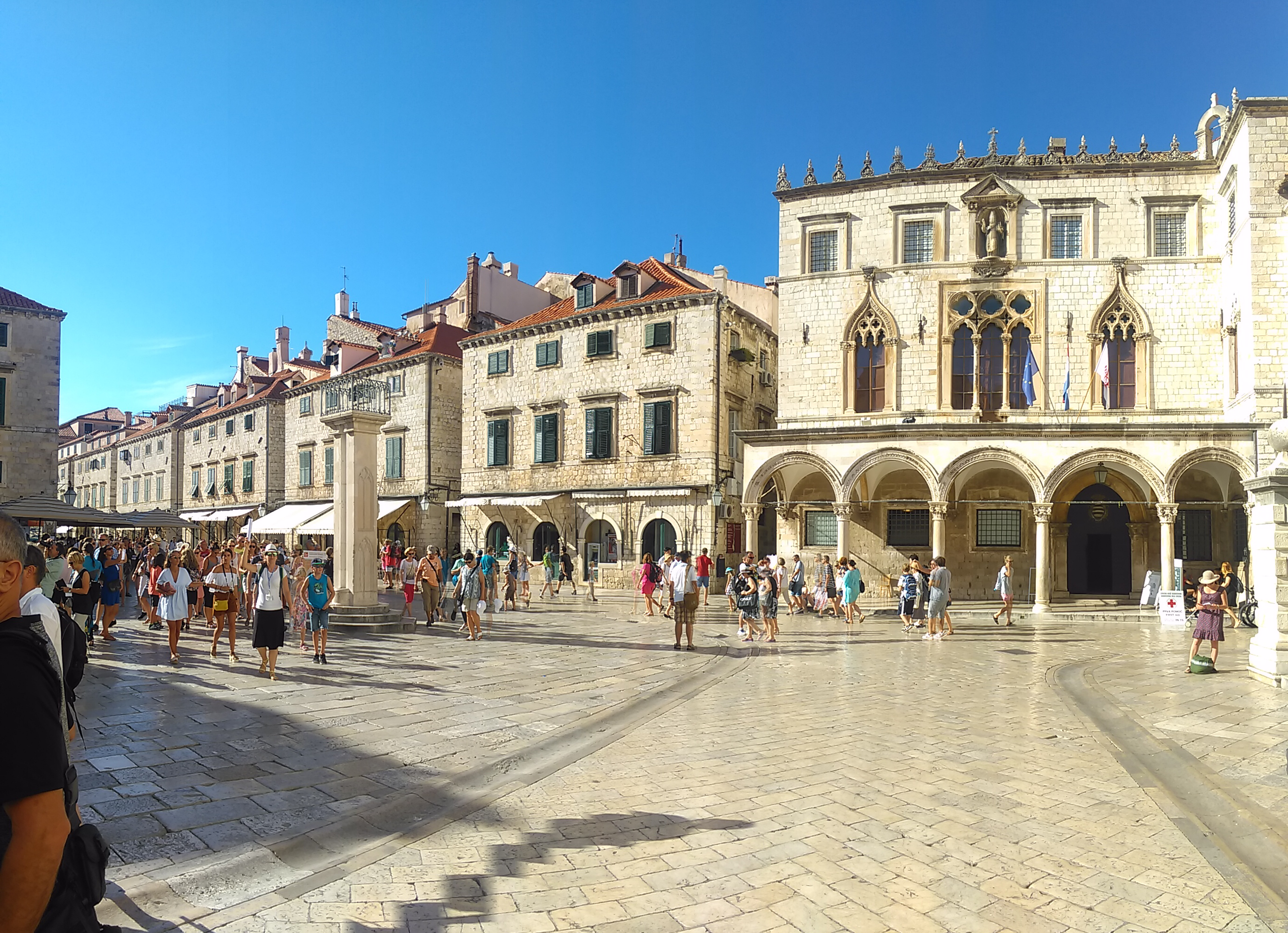
Sponza Palace and Stradun

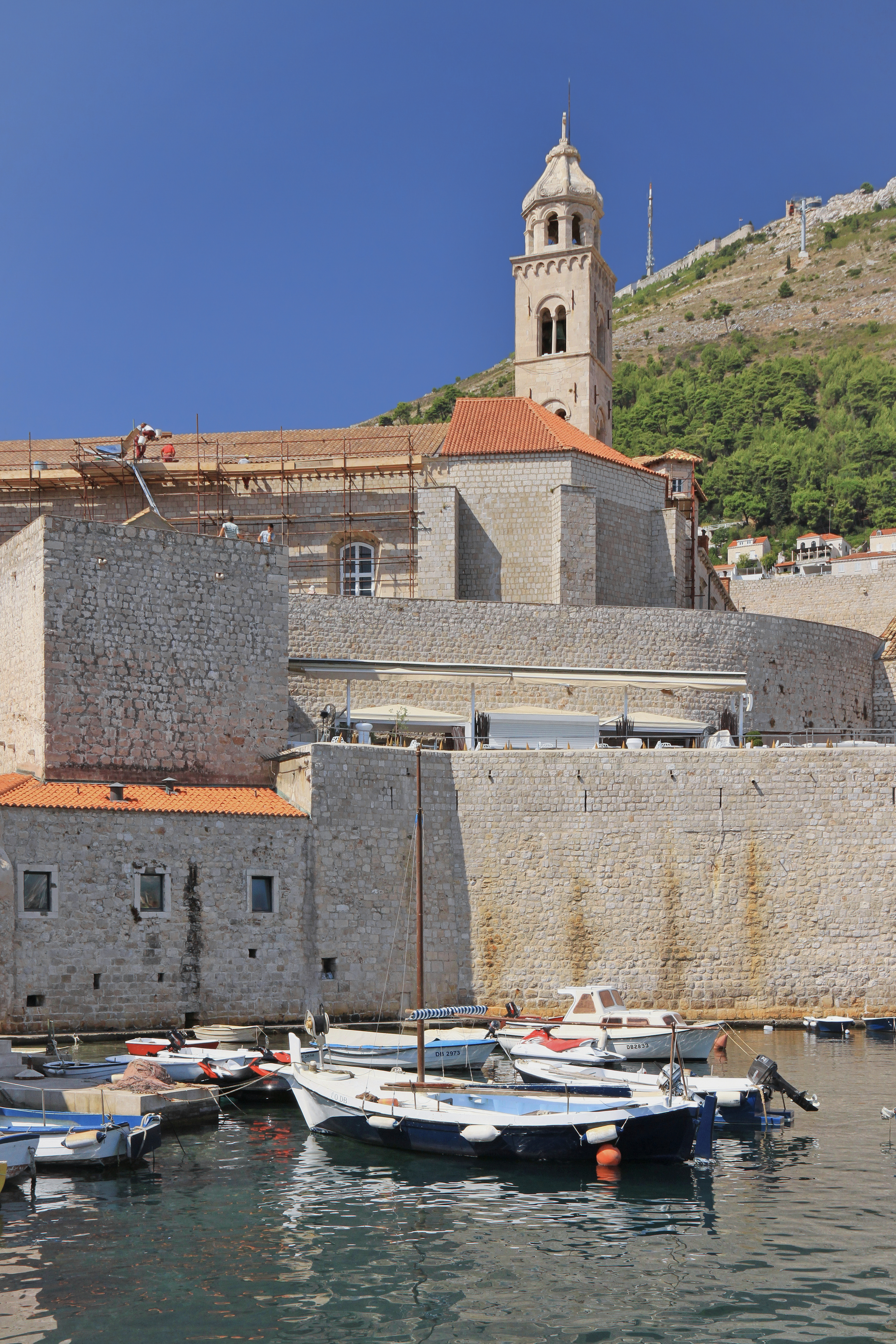
Old Port, city walls and the Dominican church

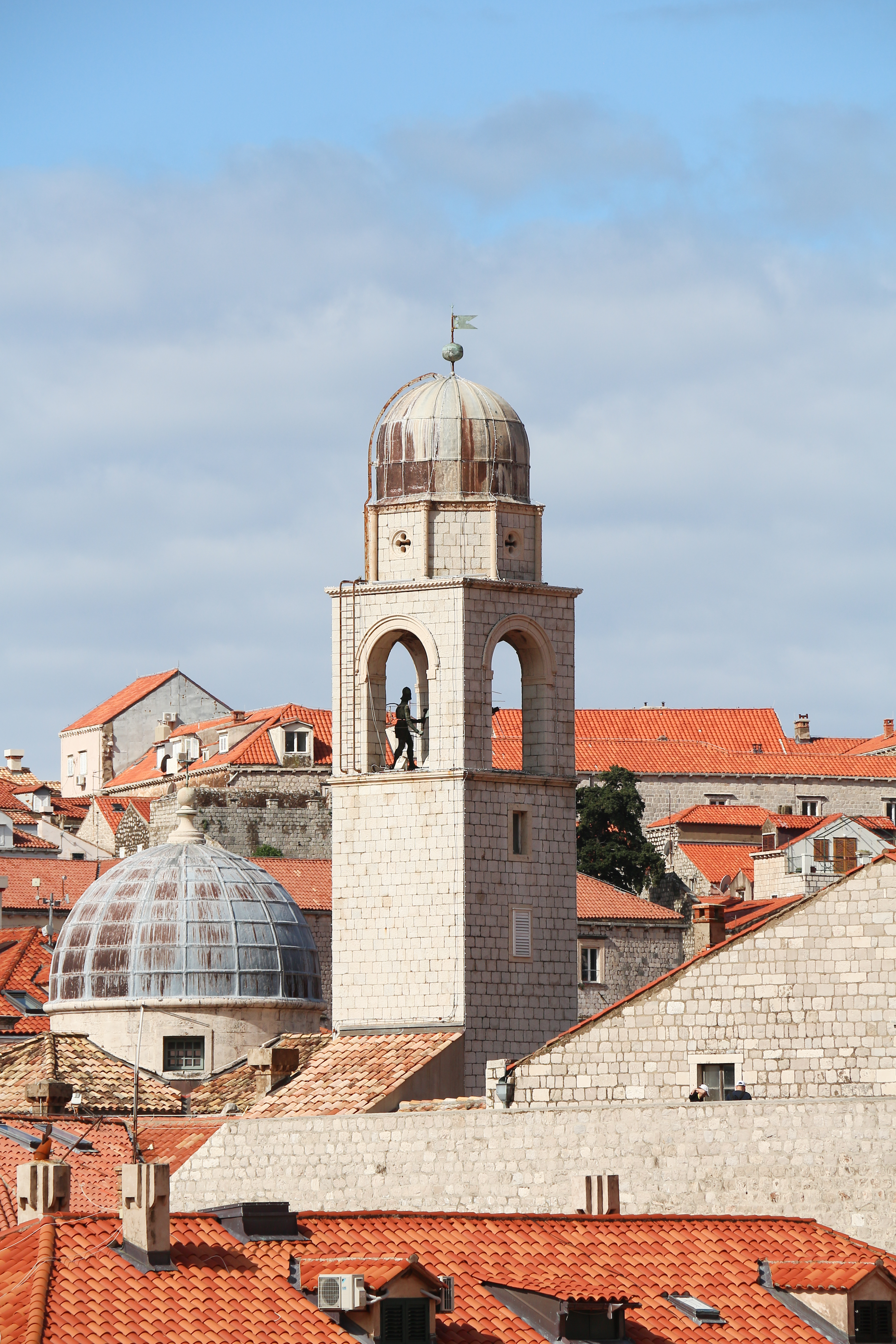
Dubrovnik Bell Tower

=== Walls of Dubrovnik ===
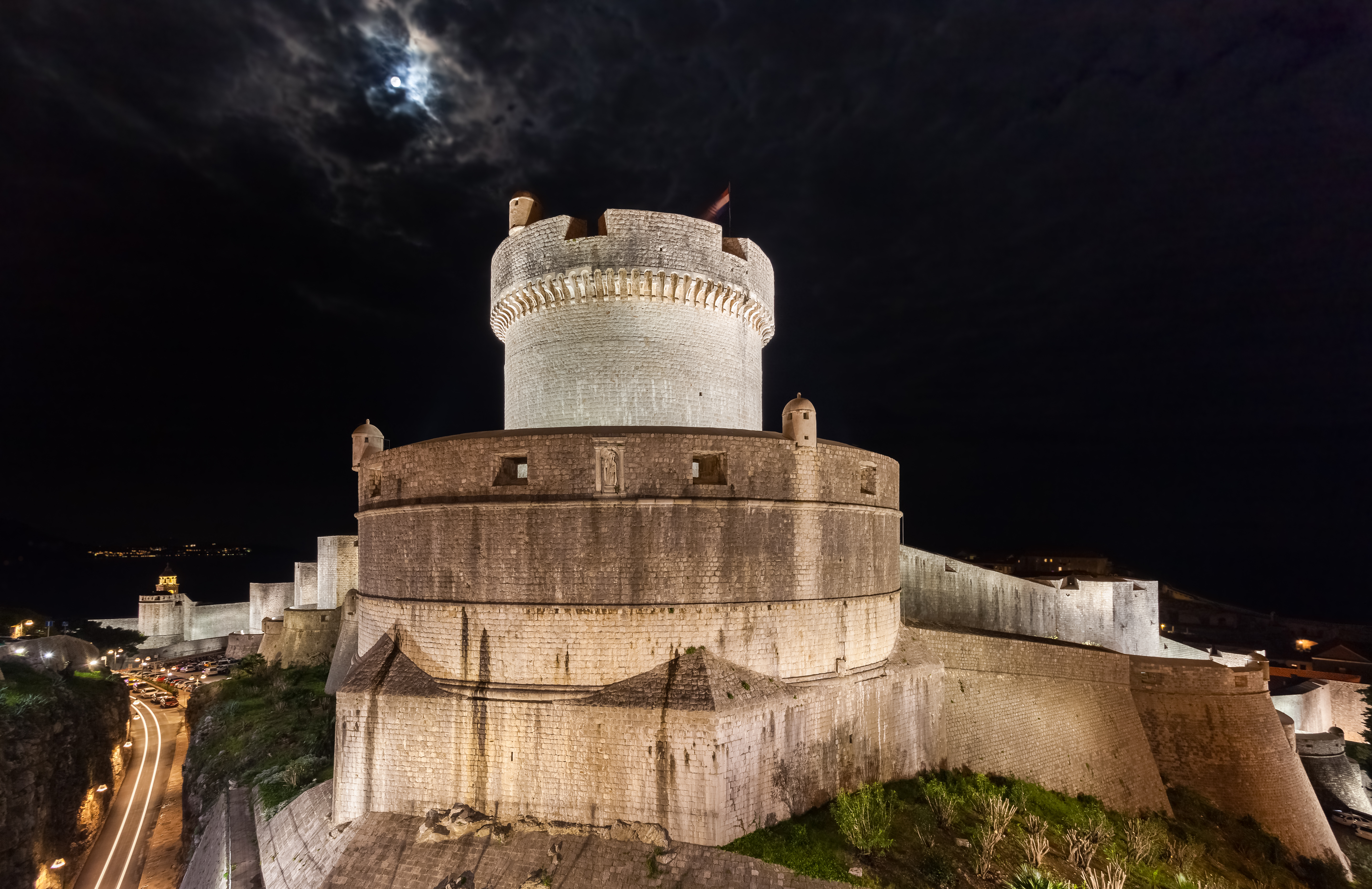
Minčeta Tower

A feature of Dubrovnik is its walls which run almost 2 kilometres (1.2 miles) around the city. The walls are 4 to 6 metres (13–20 feet) thick on the landward side but are much thinner on the seaward side. The system of turrets and towers was intended to protect the vulnerable city. The walls of Dubrovnik have also been a popular filming location for the fictional city of King's Landing in the HBO television series Game of Thrones.

The walls have been visited by 1.3 million people in 2018.

== Demographics ==
Historical populations of Dubrovnik
Year	Pop.	±%
1880	15,666	—
1890	15,329	−2.2%
1900	17,384	+13.4%
1910	18,396	+5.8%
1921	16,719	−9.1%
1931	20,420	+22.1%
1948	21,778	+6.7%
1953	24,296	+11.6%
1961	27,793	+14.4%
1971	35,628	+28.2%
1981	46,025	+29.2%
1991	51,597	+12.1%
2001	43,770	−15.2%
2011	42,615	−2.6%
2021	41,562	−2.5%
Source: Naselja i stanovništvo Republike Hrvatske 1857–2001, DZS, Zagreb, 2005

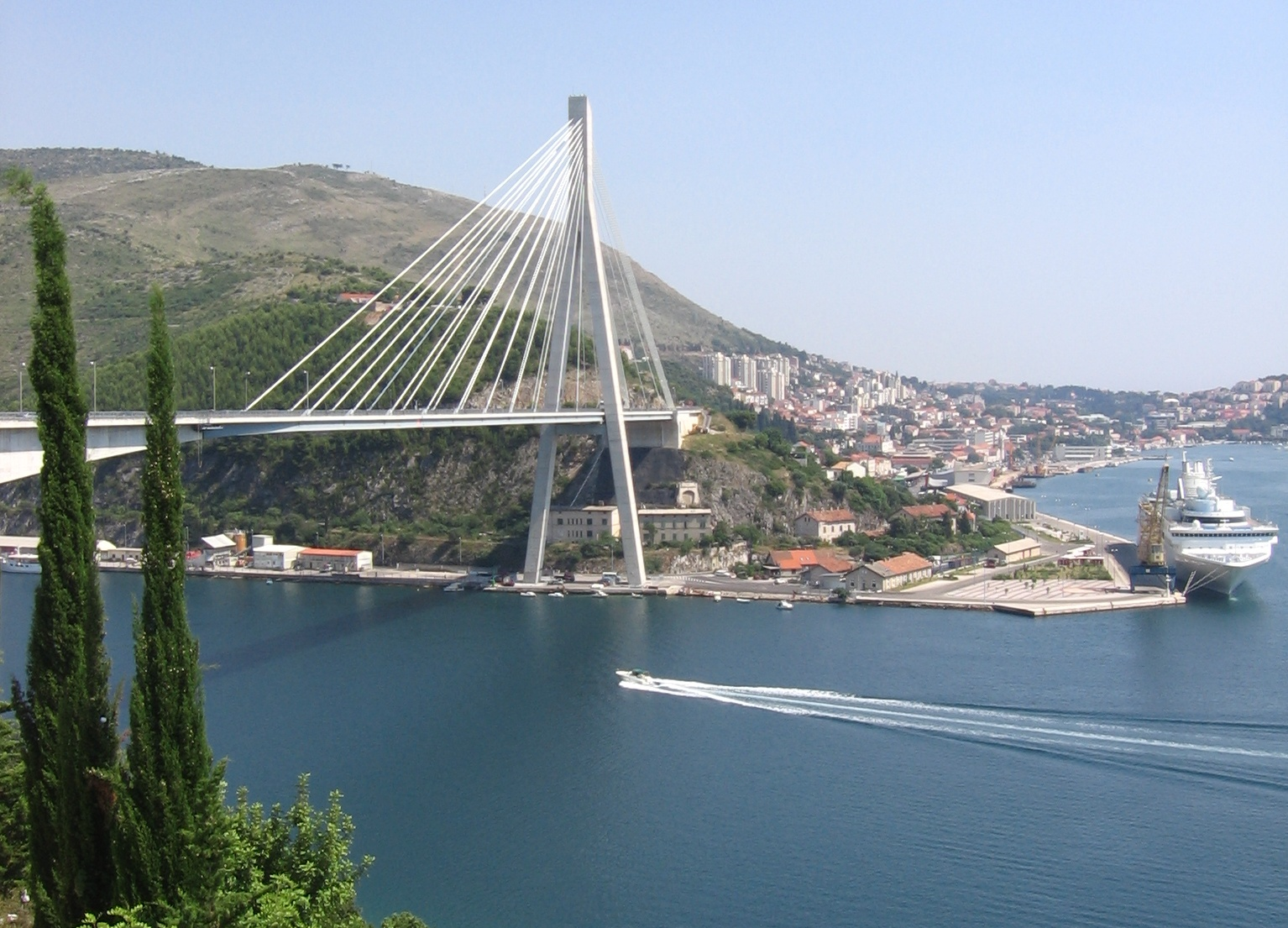
The Franjo Tuđman Bridge across the Rijeka Dubrovačka near Dubrovnik

The total population of the city is 41,562 (census 2021), in the following settlements:

- Bosanka, population 139
- Brsečine, population 96
- Čajkovica, population 160
- Čajkovići, population 26
- Donje Obuljeno, population 210
- Dubravica, population 37
- Dubrovnik, population 28,434
- Gornje Obuljeno, population 124
- Gromača, population 146
- Kliševo, population 54
- Knežica, population 133
- Koločep, population 163
- Komolac, population 320
- Lopud, population 249
- Lozica, population 146
- Ljubač, population 69
- Mokošica, population 1,924
- Mravinjac, population 88
- Mrčevo, population 90
- Nova Mokošica, population 6,016
- Orašac, population 631
- Osojnik, population 301
- Petrovo Selo, population 23
- Pobrežje, population 118
- Prijevor, population 453
- Rožat, population 340
- Suđurađ, population 207
- Sustjepan, population 323
- Šipanska Luka, population 211
- Šumet, population 176
- Trsteno, population 222
- Zaton, population 985

The population was 42,615 in 2011, down from 49,728 in 1991

In the 2011 census, 90.34% of the population identified as Croat, 3.52% as Bosniak, 2.73% as Serb and 0.4% as Albanian.

City of Dubrovnik: Population trends 1857–2021
v

population	14445	13398	15666	15329	17384	18396	16719	20420	21778	24296	27793	35628	46025	51597	43770	42615	41562
	1857	1869	1880	1890	1900	1910	1921	1931	1948	1953	1961	1971	1981	1991	2001	2011	2021

Sources: Croatian Bureau of Statistics publications

Throughout history, there was a significant Italian-speaking community in Dubrovnik. According to the Austrian censuses, there were 331 residents of the central settlement that used Italian as their habitual language (4.6% of the total population) in 1890, and 409 (4.6%) in 1910. The commune as a whole had 356 (3.2%) Italian speakers in 1890, and 486 (3.4%) in 1910. In 2011, only 27 people declared themselves as Italians, corresponding to 0.06% of the total population.

== Transport ==
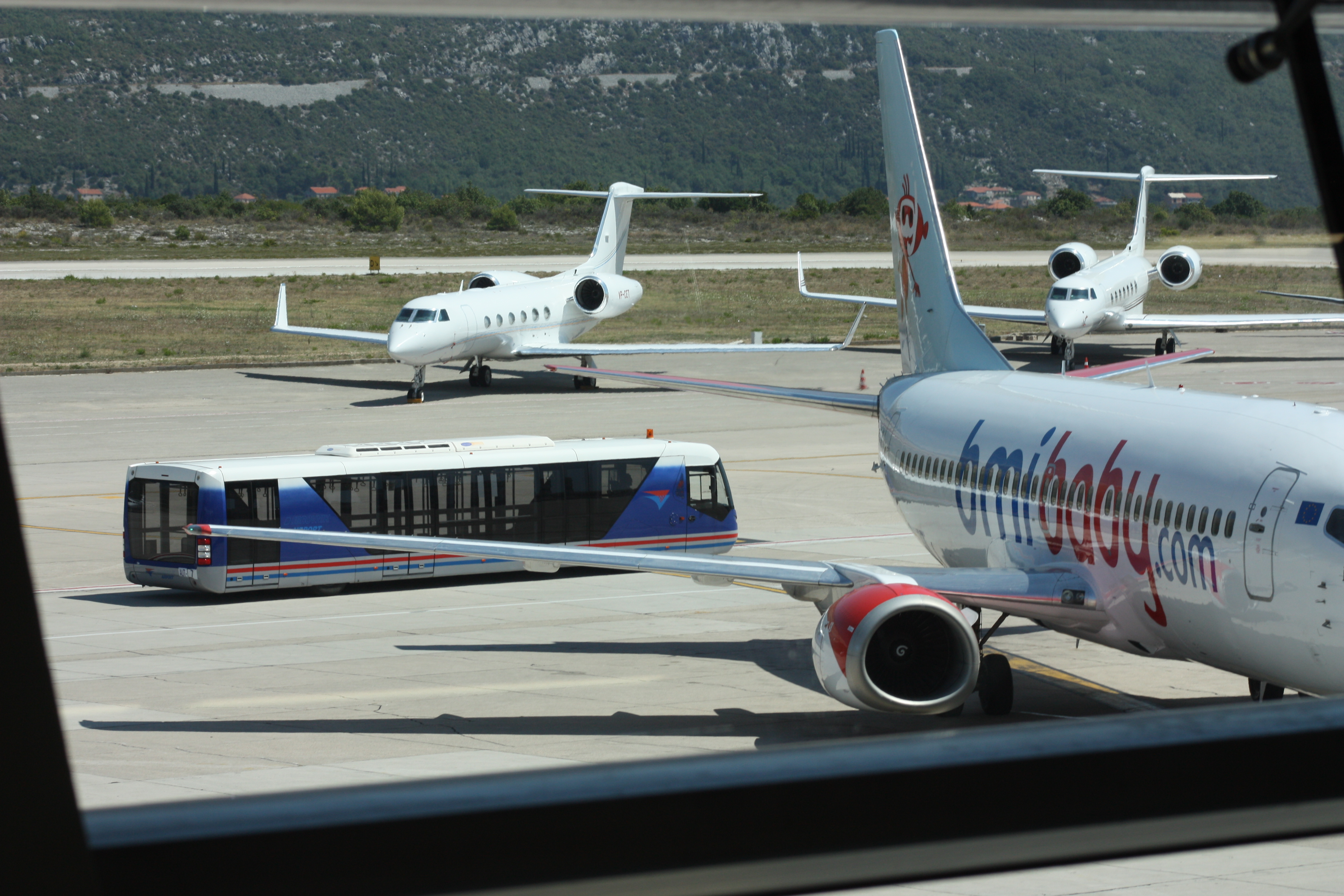
Dubrovnik Airport

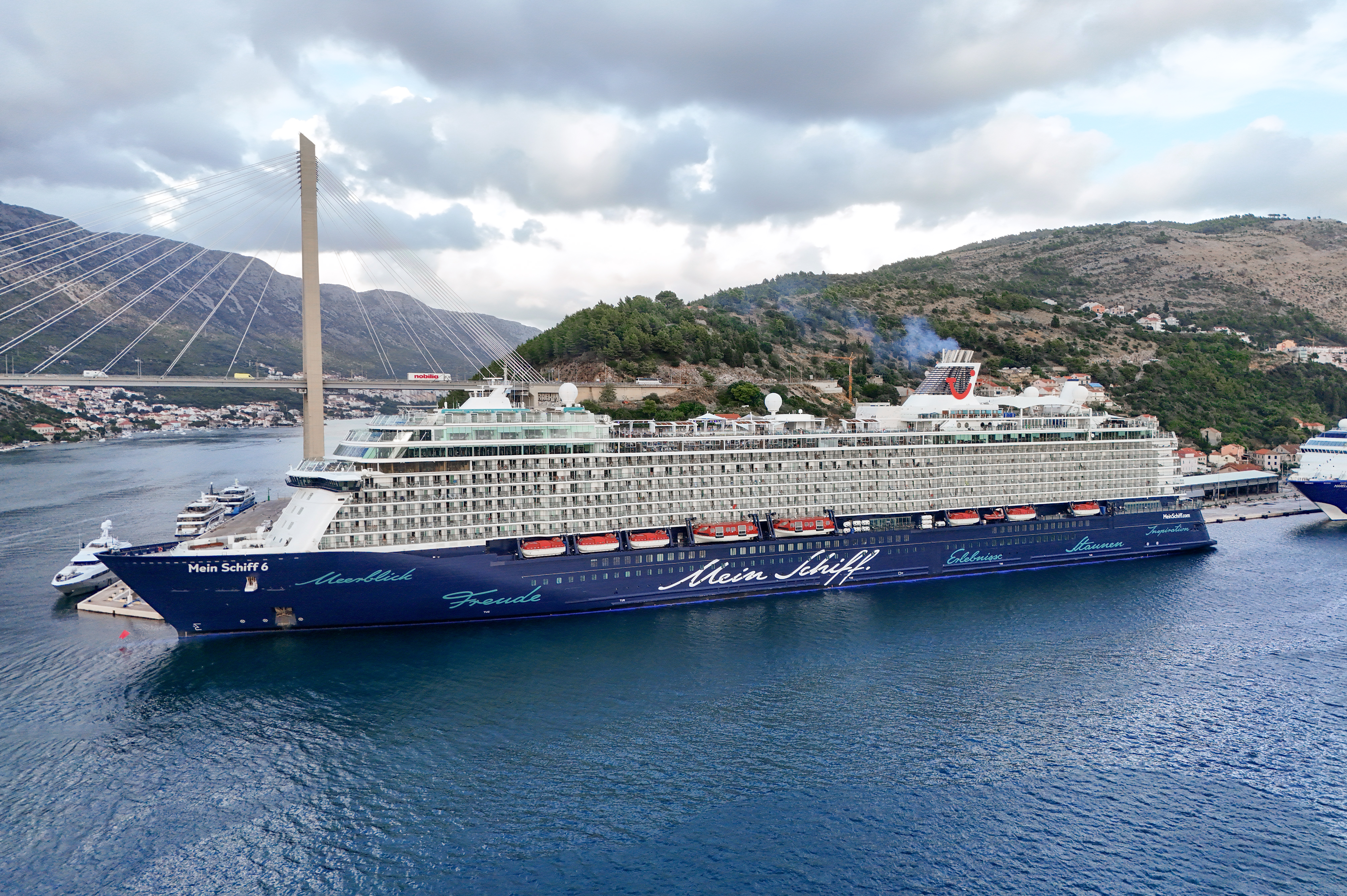
Dubrovnik Port

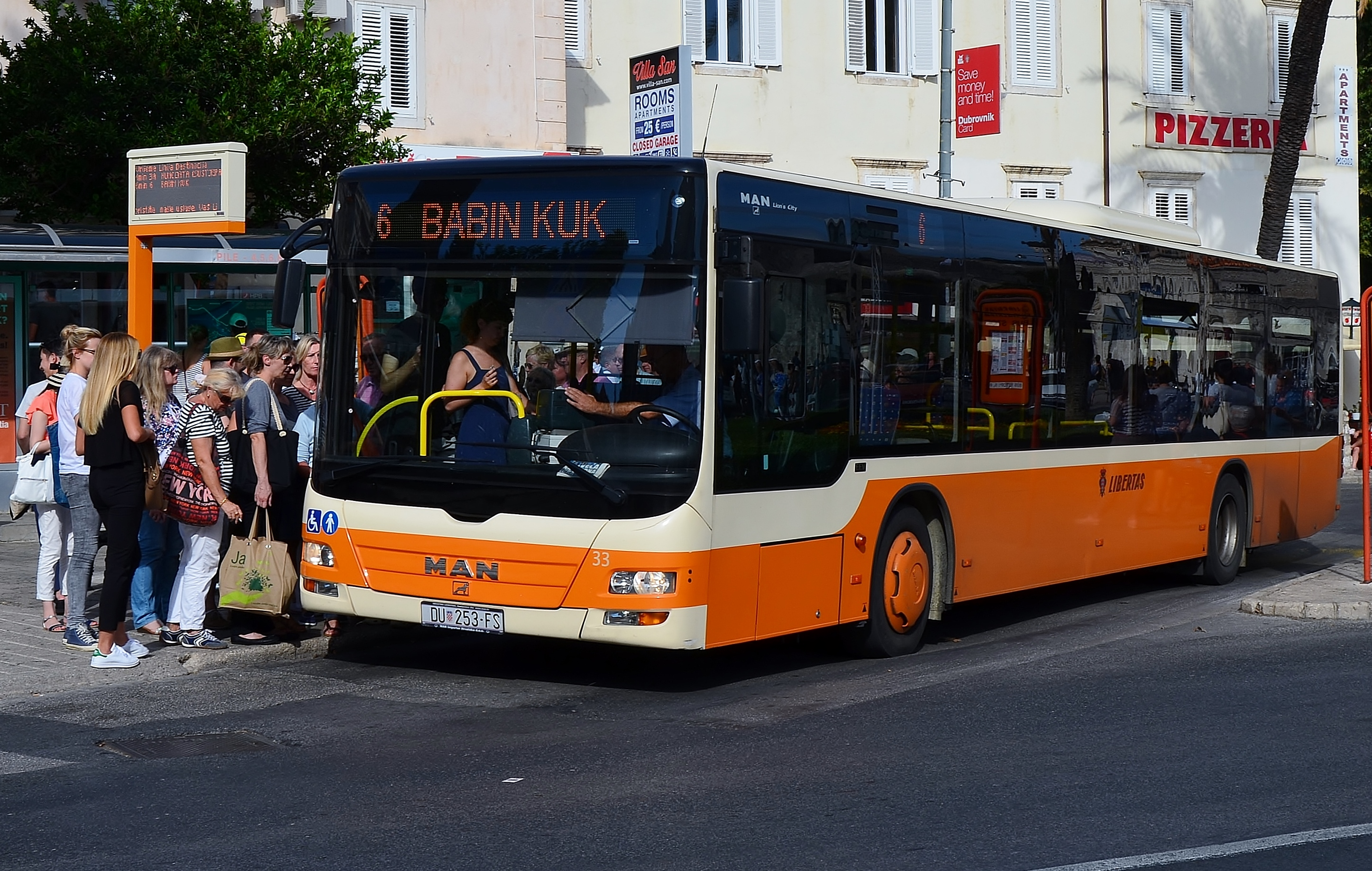
Dubrovnik public bus system

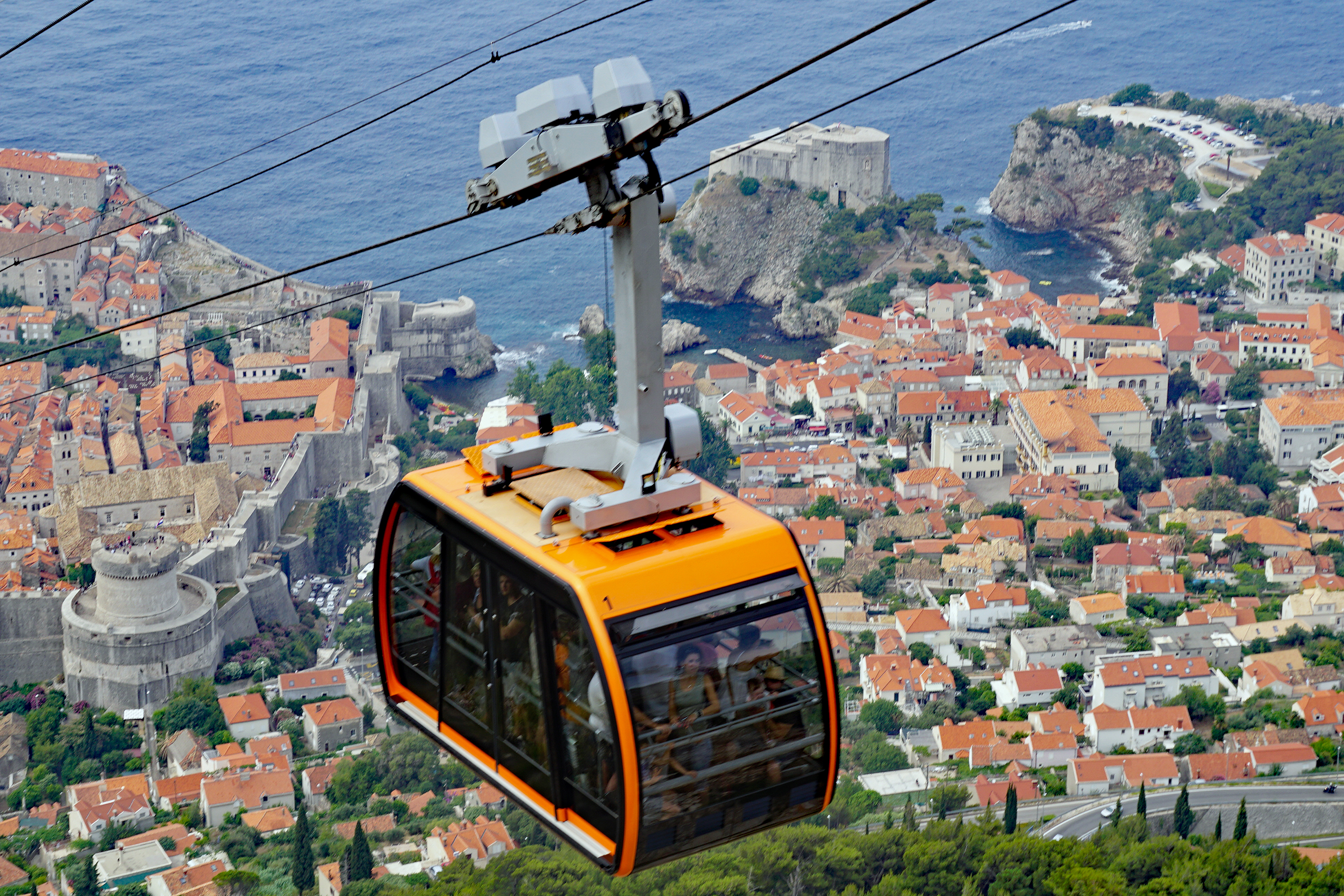
Dubrovnik Cable car

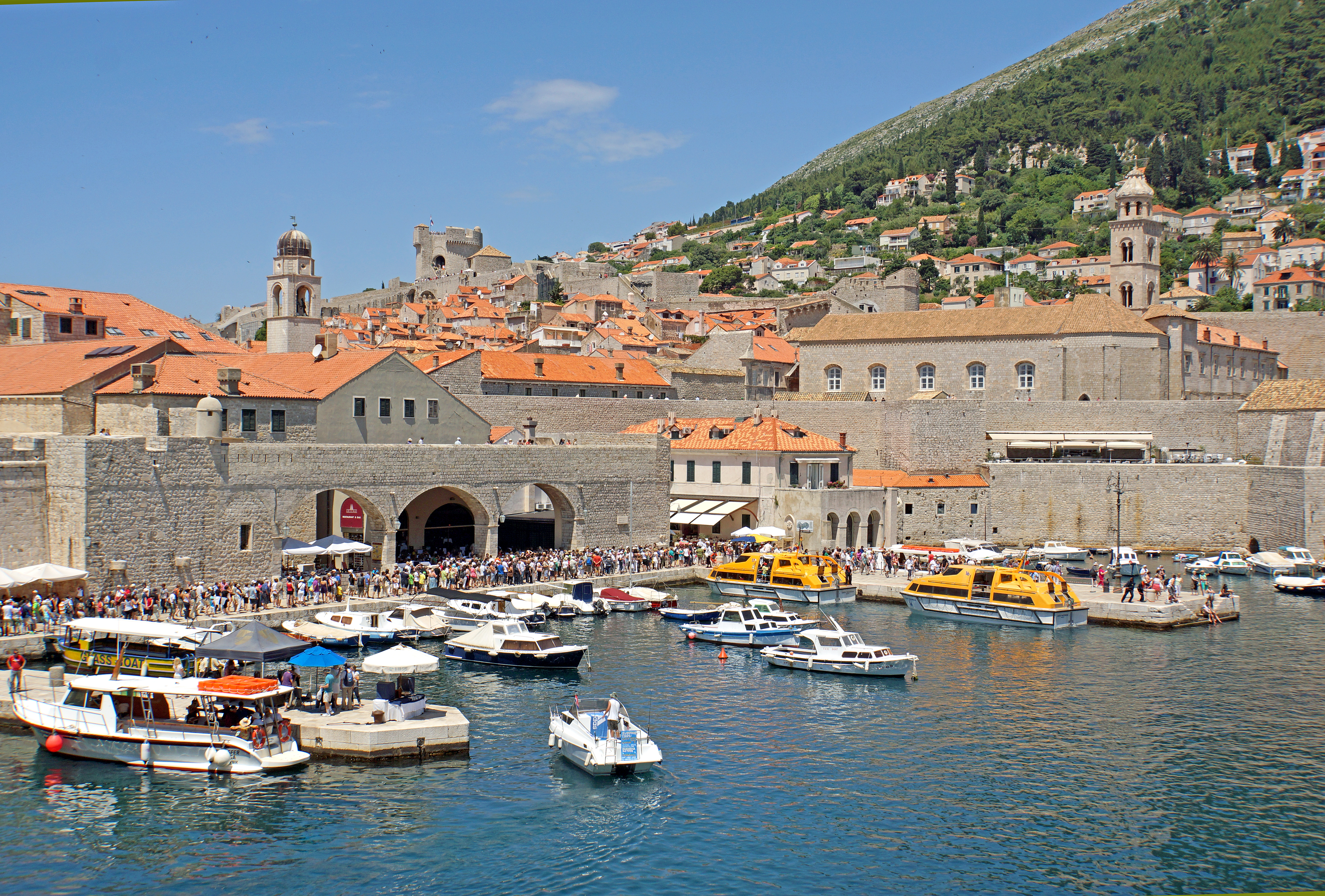
Dubrovnik City Port

=== Airport ===
Dubrovnik has its own international airport, located approximately 20 km (12 mi) southeast of Dubrovnik city centre, near Čilipi. Dubrovnik Airport is the third busiest airport in Croatia after Zagreb and Split. In 2024, Dubrovnik Airport achieved a record number of arrivals with nearly 3 million tourists.

=== Port ===
Main port in Dubrovnik is located in Gruž and it serves as transport for passenger traffic and tourists. As one of Croatia's most prominent ports, it handles a significant amounts of cruise ships, ferries, private yachts and cargo ships. Dubrovnik Port is connected with others islands and towns including Split, Rijeka, Komiža, Korčula, Sobra, Pomena, Lopud and Bari in Italy. There is a city harbour in old town of Dubrovnik, which connects Dubrovnik with Lokrum island.

=== Buses ===
Dubrovnik has a public bus system which connects the airport with the Dubrovnik old main bus station in Gruž. In addition, a network of modern, local buses connects all Dubrovnik neighbourhoods running frequently from dawn to midnight including the Municipality of Župa Dubrovnik, the Municipality of Konavle, the Municipality of Dubrovnik Primorje, the Municipality of Ston and the Municipality of Orebić. However, Dubrovnik, unlike Croatia's other major centres, is not accessible by rail; until 1975 Dubrovnik was connected to Mostar and Sarajevo by a narrow-gauge railway (760 mm) built during the Austro-Hungarian rule of Bosnia. In addition to the railway transit, Dubrovnik had a tram system, which was in operation from 1910 to 1970.

=== Cable car ===
Dubrovnik has a cable car service from Old town (Donja postaja, "Lower station") to the top of Srđ mountain (Gornja postaja, "Upper station"). The Dubrovnik Cable Car, known as "Dubrovačka žičara" in Croatian, was first constructed in 1969. It was the first cable car in the Adriatic region and initially transported up to 15 people at a time. However, the cable car was severely damaged during the Siege of Dubrovnik in 1991 and ceased operations. After years of inactivity, the cable car underwent a complete restoration and reopened in 2010, offering modern and improved facilities to visitors.

=== Highways and roads ===
The A1 highway, in use between Zagreb and Ploče, is planned to be extended all the way to Dubrovnik. Because the area around the city is disconnected from the rest of Croatian territory, the highway will either cross the Pelješac Bridge whose construction was completed in 2022, or run through Neum in Bosnia and Herzegovina and continue to Dubrovnik.

== Education ==
Dubrovnik has a number of higher educational institutions. These include the University of Dubrovnik, the Libertas University (Dubrovnik International University), Rochester Institute of Technology Croatia (former American College of Management and Technology), a University Centre for Postgraduate Studies of the University of Zagreb, and an Institute of History of the Croatian Academy of Sciences and Arts.

== Sports ==
Local waterpolo club VK Jug is among the most successful in Croatian history, with many of its players being members of the Croatia national water polo team.

The city co-hosted (with Zagreb) the 2024 Water Polo Championship at the Gruž Pool as well as 2025 World Men's Handball Championship at the new arena, along with the countries Denmark and Norway.

Local football club NK GOŠK Dubrovnik has been playing in the third tier of the Croatian football pyramid for years.

Atletski klub Dubrovnik is local track and field club, successful in youth categories.

The local chapter of the HPS is HPD "Orjen", which had 96 members in 1936 under the Đuro Orlić presidency. At the time, it also had a ski section, a caving section and a photography section. Membership fell to 87 in 1937. Membership rose to 90 in 1938.

== Twin towns and sister cities ==
Dubrovnik is twinned with:

- Venice, Italy
- Bad Homburg vor der Höhe, Germany
- Beyoğlu, Turkey
- Cetinje, Montenegro
- Graz, Austria
- Helsingborg, Sweden
- Imotski, Croatia
- Monterey, United States
- Ragusa, Italy
- Ravenna, Italy
- Rueil-Malmaison, France
- Sanya, China
- Sarajevo, Bosnia and Herzegovina
- Sorrento, Italy
- Vukovar, Croatia

== In popular culture ==
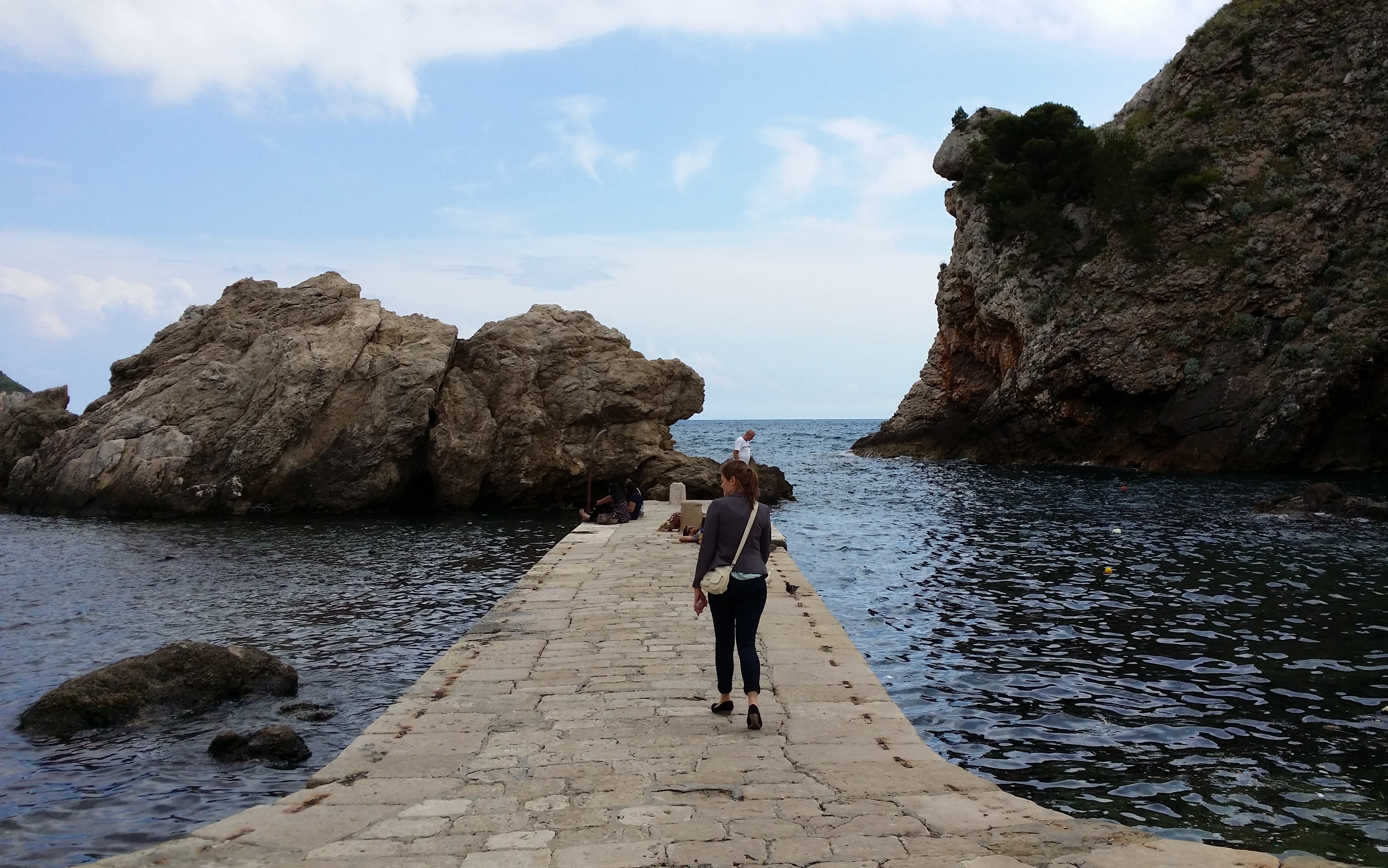
Location of Kings Landing from Game of Thrones

Roger Corman's 1964 war thriller The Secret Invasion is set in Dubrovnik and was filmed on location there. Although the story is fiction the fighting between Italian and German troops depicted at the end is based on fact.

The HBO series Game of Thrones used Dubrovnik as a filming location, representing the cities of King's Landing and Qarth, primarily the former, from season 2 onwards.

Parts of Star Wars: The Last Jedi were filmed in Dubrovnik in March 2016, in which Dubrovnik was used as the setting for the casino city of Canto Bight.

Dubrovnik was one of the European sites used in the Bollywood movie Fan (2016), starring Shah Rukh Khan.

In early 2017, Robin Hood was filmed on locations in Dubrovnik.

In Kander and Ebb's song "Ring Them Bells", the protagonist, Shirley Devore, goes to Dubrovnik to look for a husband and meets her neighbor from New York.

The text-based video game Quarantine Circular is set aboard a ship off the coast of Dubrovnik, and a few references to the city are made throughout the course of the game.

The Dubrovniks were an Australian Independent rock band formed in 1987. Often regarded as a 'Supergroup' due to the band members having played in various established bands such as Hoodoo Gurus, Beasts of Bourbon, and The Scientists. The band chose their name due to two members of the band Roddy Radalj (guitar vocals) and Boris Sujdovik (bass) being born in Dubrovnik.

== Gallery ==
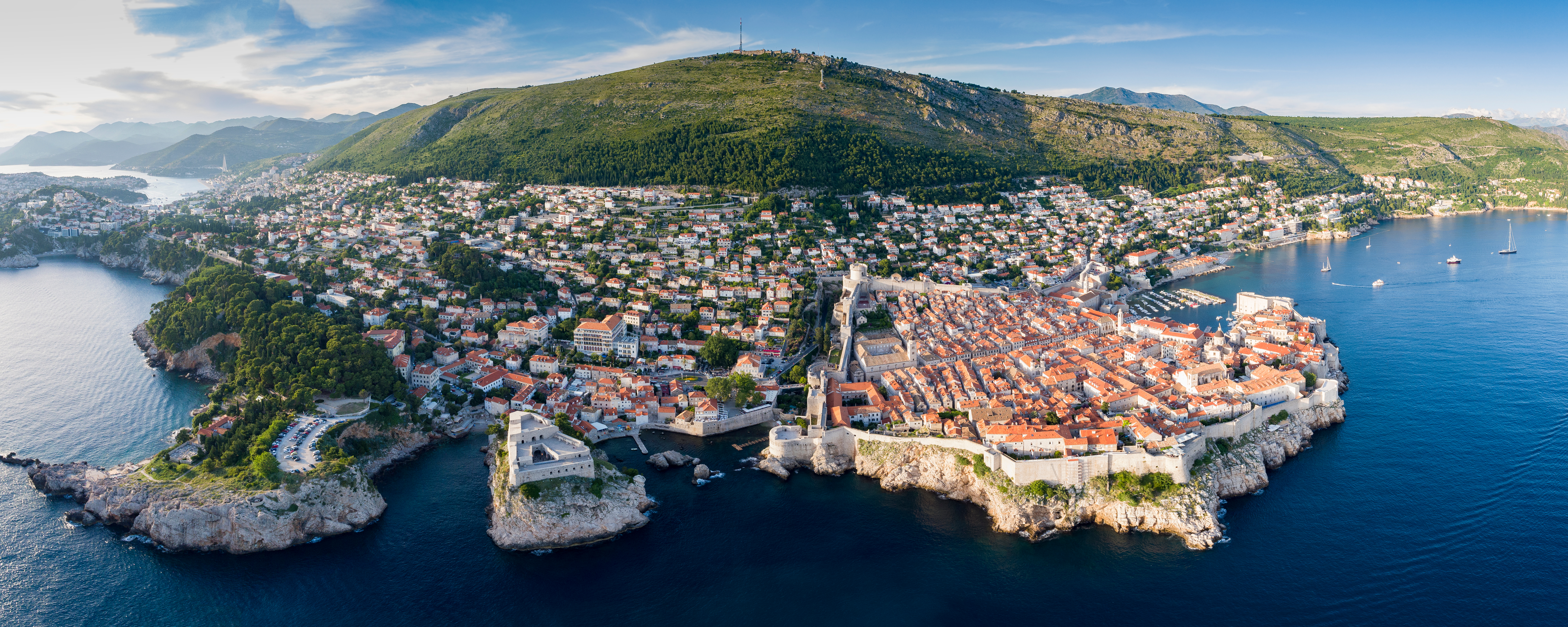
Panoramic view of Dubrovnik

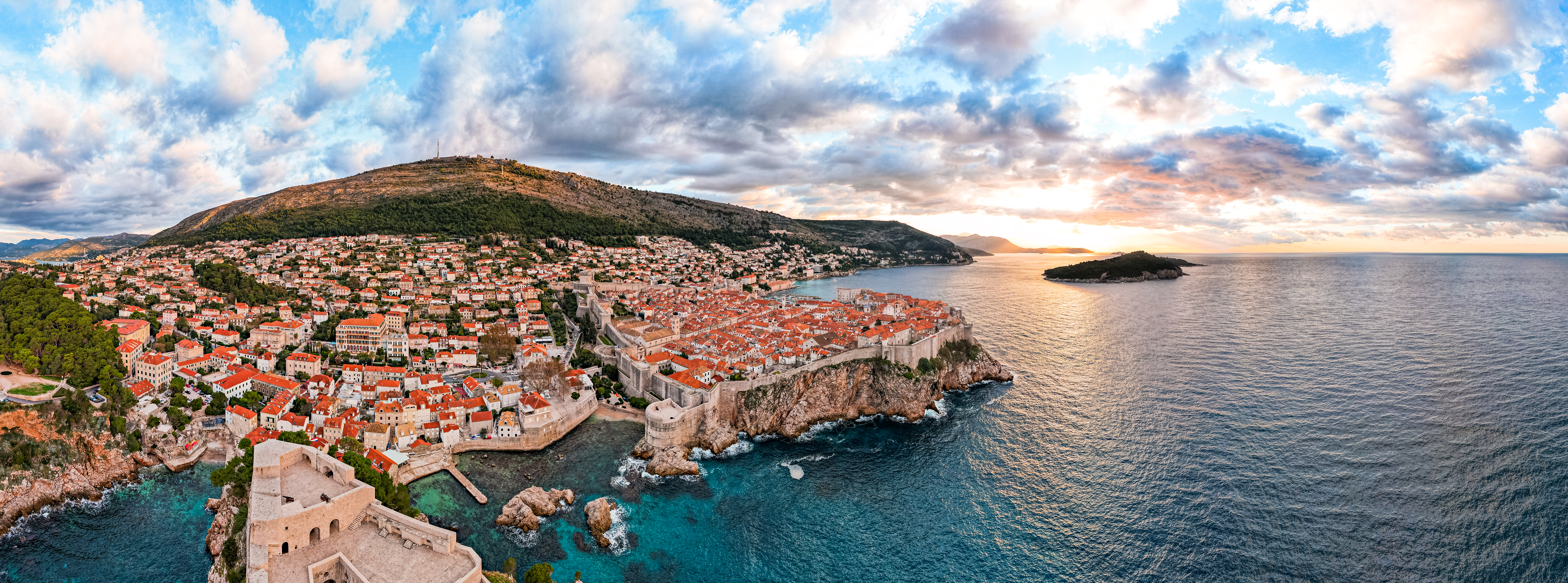
Panorama of Dubrovnik during sunrise and island of Lokrum

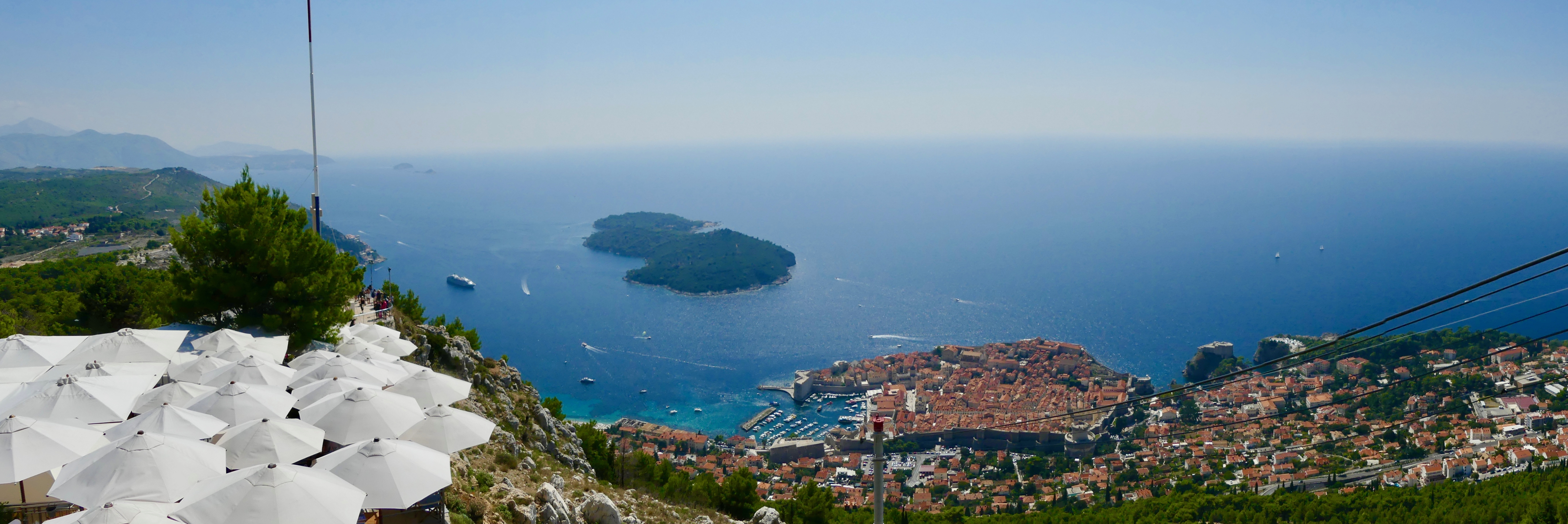
Panoramic view of Dubrovnik from Srđ mountain

== Notable people ==
- Franco Sacchetti (Ragusa, 1332 – San Miniato, 1400), poet and novelist
- Benedetto Cotrugli (Ragusa, 1416 – L'Aquila, 1469), humanist and economist.
- Bonino de Boninis (Lastovo, Ragusa, 1454 – Treviso, 1528), typographist and bookseller.
- Elio Lampridio Cerva (Ragusa, 1463 – 1520), humanist, poet and lexicographer of Latin language
- Marin Držić (Ragusa, 1508 – Venice, 1567), playwright, poet and dramaturge
- Marino Ghetaldi (Ragusa, 1568 – 1626), mathematician
- Aaron ben David Cohen (Ragusa, ~1580 - 1656), rabbi
- Giorgio Raguseo (Ragusa, 1580 – 1622), philosopher, theologian, and orator
- Rajmund Zamanja (Ragusa, 1587 – 1647), theologist, philosopher and linguist.
- Ivan Gundulić (Ragusa, 1589 – 1638), writer and poet
- Anselmo Banduri (Ragusa, 1671 – Paris, 1743), numismatist and antiquarian
- Ruđer Josip Bošković (Dubrovnik, 1711 – Milan, 1787) physicist, astronomer, mathematician, philosopher, diplomat, poet, theologian
- Mato Vodopić (Dubrovnik, 1816), bishop of Dubrovnik
- Matija Ban (Dubrovnik, 1818), poet, dramatist, and playwright
- Medo Pucić (Dubrovnik, 1821), writer and politician
- Konstantin Vojnović (Dubrovnik, 1832), politician, university professor and rector in the Kingdom of Dalmatia and Kingdom of Croatia-Slavonia of the Habsburg monarchy
- Nicola Primorac (Dubrovnik, 1840), tobacconist, who together with a sailor and a ship's steward sailed the tiny yawl City of Ragusa twice across the Atlantic in 1870 and 1871
- Ivo Vojnović (Dubrovnik, 1857), writer
- Milan Rešetar (Dubrovnik, 1860), philologist
- Trpimir Macan (Dubrovnik, 1935), historian and lexicographer
- Tereza Kesovija (Dubrovnik, 1938), pop-classical-chanson singer
- Dubravka Tomšič Srebotnjak (Dubrovnik, 1940), pianist
- Milo Hrnić (Dubrovnik, 1950–2023), pop singer
- Andro Knego (Dubrovnik, 1956), basketball player, Olympic and World champion
- Banu Alkan (Dubrovnik, 1958), female actor
- Dragan Andrić (Dubrovnik, 1962), water polo player, two-time Olympic champion
- Mario Kopić (Dubrovnik, 1965), philosopher
- Nikola Prkačin (Dubrovnik, 1975), basketball player
- Vlado Georgiev (Dubrovnik, 1976), pop singer, composer, and songwriter
- Frano Vićan (Dubrovnik, 1976), water polo player, Olympic, World and European champion
- Emir Spahić (Dubrovnik, 1980), football player
- Miho Bošković (Dubrovnik, 1983), water polo player, Olympic, World and European champion
- Nikša Dobud (Dubrovnik, 1985), water polo player, Olympic and World champion
- Lukša Andrić (Dubrovnik, 1985), basketball player
- Hrvoje Perić (Dubrovnik, 1985), basketball player
- Andro Bušlje (Dubrovnik, 1986), water polo player, Olympic, World and European champion
- Paulo Obradović (Dubrovnik, 1986), water polo player, Olympic and World champion
- Maro Joković (Dubrovnik, 1987), water polo player, Olympic, World and European champion
- Ante Tomić (Dubrovnik, 1987), basketball player
- Andrija Prlainović (Dubrovnik, 1987), water polo player, Olympic, World and European champion
- Sandro Sukno (Dubrovnik, 1990), water polo player, Olympic and World champion
- Elvis Sarić (Dubrovnik, 1990), football player
- Danijal Brković (Dubrovnik, 1991), football player
- Petra Dičak (Dubrovnik, 1995), beach handball player
- Mario Hezonja (Dubrovnik, 1995), basketball player
- Alen Halilović (Dubrovnik, 1996), football player
- Ana Konjuh (Dubrovnik, 1997), tennis player
- Zvonimir Srna (Dubrovnik, 1998), handball player

== Acknowledgements ==
Dubrovnik was included in the Travel + Leisure 25 Most Beautiful Cities in the World list, ranked 18th.

=== Honorary citizens ===
Named by Dubrovnik City Council:

- Kathy Wilkes (1991–1992)
- Ivan Supek (1997)
- Pope John Paul II (2003)
- Christopher Patten (2004)
- Stjepan Mesić (2009)
- Ante Gotovina (2012)
- Francesco Cossiga (2023)

== See also ==
- Dalmatia
- Dubrovnik chess set
- Lovrijenac
- List of World Heritage Sites in Croatia
- List of people from Dubrovnik
- Republic of Ragusa
- Tourism in Croatia
- Walls of Dubrovnik

== Bibliography ==
- Peterjon Cresswell; Ismay Atkins & Lily Dunn (2006). Time Out Croatia (First ed.). London, Berkeley & Toronto: Time Out Group Ltd. & Ebury Publishing, Random House Ltd. ISBN 978-1-904978-70-1.
- Harris, Robin (2003). Dubrovnik, A History. London: Saqi Books. ISBN 0-86356-332-5.
- Adriana Kremenjaš-Daničić, ed. (2006). Roland's European Paths. Dubrovnik: Europski dom Dubrovnik. ISBN 953-95338-0-5.
- Marko Kovac (4 February 2003). "Dubrovnik's Heritage Under Threat". BBC News Online. Archived from the original on 8 June 2025.
- Frank McDonald (18 July 2008). "The 'Pearl' loses its lustre". The Irish Times. Archived from the original on 17 October 2012.
- Joshua Wright (7 June 2004). "Will greed tarnish Croatia's gem?". The New York Times. Archived from the original on 29 August 2017.
- Vojnović, Lujo (2009). Pad Dubrovnika (1797.-1806.) [Fall of Dubrovnik (1797-1806)] (in Croatian). Fortuna. ISBN 978-953-95981-9-6.
- Kravar, Miroslav (1994). "Oko toponima Ragusa za Dubrovnik" [About the place-name Ragusa for Dubrovnik]. Folia onomastica Croatica (in Croatian) (3). Linguistic Research Institute of the Croatian Academy of Sciences and Arts: 77–87. ISSN 1330-0695.
