= HMS Saracen (1812) =

Brig-sloop of the Royal Navy

History

United Kingdom
- Name: HMS Saracen
- Ordered: 26 September 1811
- Builder: Bools & Good, Bridport
- Laid down: November 1811
- Launched: 25 July 1812
- Fate: Sold 1819

United Kingdom
- Name: Saracen
- Port of registry: London
- Acquired: 1819 by purchase
- Fate: Wrecked 1828

General characteristics
- Class & type: Cruizer-class brig-sloop
- Tons burthen: 38660/94, or 402 (bm)
- Length: 100 ft 1 in (30.5 m) (overall); 77 ft 3 1/2 in (23.6 m) (keel)
- Beam: 30 ft 8 in (9.3 m)
- Draught: 6 ft 6 in (1.98 m) (unladen); 11 ft 0 in (3.35 m) (laden)
- Depth of hold: 12 ft 10 in (3.91 m)
- Propulsion: Sails
- Sail plan: Brig
- Complement: 121
- Armament: 16 × 32-pounder carronades; 2 × 6-pounder chase guns

HMS Saracen was launched in 1812 at Portsmouth for the British Royal Navy. She had an active, though brief, naval career during which she captured a number of enemy-held islands and enemy vessels. The navy sold her in 1819 and new owners employed her as a whaler for two voyages between 1819 and 1826. She was apparently wrecked in 1828 off the coast of Chile, but with little or no loss of life.

== HMS Saracen ==
=== Napoleonic Wars ===
The Royal Navy commissioned Saracen in August 1812 under Commander John Harper. All he had available to him were his marines and "a few worn-out sailors, retained for harbour duty". On 21 August Sir Richard Bickerton, commander-in-chief at Portsmouth, ordered Harper to patrol off the coast. The next evening Saracen was some 7 or 8 miles (11 or 13 km) off Beachy Head when Harper observed two large luggers chasing three well-laden British merchant vessels. After a short chase and some combat, Saracen succeeded in capturing the French privateer Coureur (or Courier), of Calais, by coming alongside and boarding her. Coureur was armed with 14 guns and had a crew of 50 men under the command of Captain Joreur. French casualties amounted to Joreur and two men wounded; Saracen had no casualties. Harper then returned with his prize to Portsmouth. He had too few men to man the prize, guard his prisoners, and still chase the second privateer. The prisoners reported that the second lugger was Honoria, of the same strength as Coureur. Coureur was a new vessel, and the two privateers were only eight hours out of Dieppe and had not captured anything when Saracen had appeared on the scene.

Once Saracen had a full crew, Harper sailed her to the Mediterranean on 17 November. Initially Saracen convoyed merchant vessels sailing between Malta and the Archipelago. Harper was to operate from the Smyrna station, but he requested permission, which was granted, to sail to the Adriatic.

Saracen's first exploit occurred 17 June 1813. During a dark and stormy night, Harper took her boats and a landing party of some 40 seamen and marines to capture Zupano. This was one of three small islands on which the French had placed a garrison to protect vessels sailing into Ragusa. Harper and his men were able to capture 39 French soldiers, though some 16 escaped. The British had to rely on bayonets in their attack as the rain had rendered their ammunition unserviceable. Still, in the 10 minute struggle they suffered only minor casualties. Harper dismissed and reorganized the national guard, dismissed the mayor, and appointed a local notable in his place.

After the loss of Zupano the French planned to reinforce their garrison on Mezzo, an island between Ragusa and Zupano. Harper and Captain Black, of Weazel, determined to forestall its reinforcement. On 17 July marines from both vessels landed and took possession of the town. The French retreated to a fortified castle on a hill, which the British then bombarded with a 12-pounder carronade they had brought from one of the ships. Harper had to leave for two days to go to Curzola. In his absence, Weazel's men established a battery of three brass guns on a point overlooking the castle. On 22 July, after his return, the British started firing on the castle. The French surrendered that afternoon. The British captured five 9-pounder guns, a brass howitzer, munitions, and 59 men. The British freed their captives against their parole that they would not serve against the British until exchanged for an equal number of British prisoners. The capture of the island cost Saracen one man killed, and Weazle two men wounded.

Harper left the marines from Saracen and the brig Wizard, which had joined Saracen and put under Harper's orders, on Mezzo as a garrison. He also established a telegraph station on the island. After the loss of Zupano, the French general at Ragusa withdrew his men from Calamotta, the third of the Elaphiti Islands.

Harper and Saracen then extended the British blockade to Boca di Cattaro. Harper left a boat and eleven men to blockade Stagno and survey the coast. On 13 August a landing party from Saracen, Weazle, and Wizard landed at Boca di Cattaro and destroyed two batteries, one unfinished and the other armed with three 18-pounder guns that the landing party spiked and threw into the sea. The only two casualties were two men from Saracen, who were wounded.

Wizard and Weazle were needed elsewhere but Saracen remained, harassing the coast. Harper proceeded to use boats he had captured and Saracen's boats to make night raids along the coast. To augment his forces after dark Harper would take the marines he had on Mezzo, leaving only a lame man behind to give the impression of activity, and would then return them before dawn. One night in September, Harper received intelligence that the French were moving some 50 bullocks by road from Ragusa under a weak escort. He took 20 men, all that he had available, landed them, drove off the escort, gathered the bullocks, put them on some fishing boats, and brought them to Saracen.

On 12 October the frigate Bacchante, Captain Hoste, arrived off Ragusa. There three Sicilian gunboats and 50 soldiers joined him, as did Saracen. Harper took two of the gunboats, some boats from Saracen, and a combined force from Bacchante and Saracen and proceeded into the Boca. On the way he captured four gunboats, each armed with a 24-pounder gun (two also had an additional 12-pounder carronade in their sterns), after their local crews mutinied against the French. He then took his entire force, augmented by locals, and captured Fort St George. (Note: A first-class share of the prize and head money for the four gunboats and 156 men was worth £60 8s 1d; a sixth-class share, that of an ordinary seaman, was worth 9s 9 3/4d.) (Note: A first-class share of the prize money for the capture of Fort st George and the supplies there was worth £81 10s 6d; a sixth-class share, that of an ordinary seaman, was worth 19s 10 1/4d. A first-class share of a second payment was worth £17 1s 10d; a sixth-class share was worth 2s 2 1/2d.)

On 16 October 1813, a party from Bacchante and Saracen, together with the Royal Corsican Rangers, captured Forts Epagnole and Castel Nuova. The two forts mounted some 25 carriage guns and had a combined garrison of 299 men. (Note: A first-class share of the grant of £1600 on account for the capture was worth £125 4s 3 1/2d; a sixth-class share was worth £1 13s 3d. A first-class share of the subsequent payment of the balance was worth £89 13s 9d; a sixth-class share was worth 16s 10d. In a separate payment to the Royal Corsican Rangers, a first-class share was worth £170 18s 10d; a fifth-class share was worth £1 13s 11 1/2d.)

After the capture of the four gunboats Harper had sent them on to Cattaro to blockade it from the sea while local volunteers blockaded it from the land. On 20 October Saracen anchored near Cattaro to besiege it. Bacchante left for a time leaving Harper and Saracen to maintain the siege.

Between 20 and 23 October a party from Saracen, with the assistance of 300 Croatians, captured Stagno. There they captured 12 guns and 52 men.

In November Harper proceeded to move an 18-poudner gun to the summit of Mount Theodore, overlooking Cattaro, finally succeeding on 23 December. Bacchante returned and the British were able to establish four batteries with which to bombard Fort St John at Cattaro. They commenced firing on Christmas Day. On 1 January 1814 two more batteries were brought into action. The British were preparing for an assault on 3 January when General Baron Gauthier, the French commander, offered to capitulate. The capitulation was signed on 5 January. In all, Bacchante and Saracen captured 130 guns and 900 men at Cattaro.

On 28 January Bacchante, Saracen, and 400 Austrians captured Ragusa. There they captured 138 guns and 500 men. The fall of Ragusa left the allies in command of Dalmatia, Croatia, Istria, Frioul, and all the islands in the Adriatic.

Saracen conveyed General Gauthier and his staff to Ancona. From there she sailed to Venice to join the blockade there. On 14 May Saracen sailed 12 miles (19 km) up the canal and anchored near St Mark's. Harper and Saracen now received orders to sail to America. Before she left Harper received the Order of Leopold sent by the Emperor of Austria. Harper received promotion to post captain on 7 June, only finding out when he arrived at Gibraltar. Harper returned from North America on 26 October.

=== North America ===
Commander Alexander Dixie (acting) replaced Harper in June 1814. Between 21 October and 6 November, and 29 November and 19 December 1814, Saracen was in the Chesapeake with a squadron and so shared in the proceeds of several captures. During the first period the squadron captured the schooners Franklin and Saucy Jack. (Note: A first-class share was worth £19 19s 3 1/4d; a sixth-class share was worth 5s 1 1/2d.) During the second period the squadron captured goods from the transports Lloyd and Abeona, and the schooner Mary. (Note: A first-class share was worth £26 15s 10 1/3d; a sixth-class share was worth 6s 1 1/2d.)

On 30 October, Saracen was at Saint Mary's River, Maryland. A raiding party from Saracen landed at St Inogoes and proceeded to plunder the Jesuit mission, known as St. Inigoes Manor, including St. Ignatius Church, which was a part of the manor at the time. When the raiding party returned, Dixie sent one of his lieutenants under a flag of truce to return what had been taken and to convey a letter of apology to the priests and residents of the settlement there.

During the winter of 1814–1815, Saracen was still in the Chesapeake. One night, she slipped from her anchorage and destroyed 16 American vessels. She then sailed for the coast of France to participate in the effort to intercept Napoleon after his defeat at the battle of Waterloo. Saracen landed arms at Dieppe, where Dixie succeeded in establishing the White flag.

Dixie was still in command on 7 July 1815 at the capture of the French vessels Aimable Antoinette and Marie. Saracen, Harrier, Towey and Euryalus all shared in the prize money. (Note: A first-class share was worth £48 10s 7 3/4d; a sixth-class share was worth 17s 7 1/2d.) A secondary source states that in August 1815 Commander John Gore assumed command at Bermuda. However, another source has Dixie being paid off her on 9 September 1815. (Note: 'Being ordered off the coast of France in 1815, for the interception of Buonaparte, we find him employed in landing arms at Dieppe, where he succeeded in establishing the White flag. Since 9 Sept. in the latter year, on which date the Saracen was put out of commission. Commander Dixie has been unable to procure employment.')

On 25 April 1816, Saracen departed Portsmouth. Saracen was sent to the Halifax station for a 3 year tour of duty in 1816. Pactolus and the Saracen accompanied Forth, the flagship of Rear Admiral Griffith, to spend the winter at Bermuda, setting sail from Halifax on 10 November 1816, and arriving on 17 November.

On 16 October 1818, the Saracen was due to depart Bermuda for England.

Saracen was paid off in 1819.

== Disposal ==
The "Principal Officers and Commissioners of His Majesty's Navy" offered the "Saracen brig, of 387 tons", lying at Chatham, for sale on 22 July 1819. Saracen was sold on 18 August to William Wilkinson for £1,150.

== Whaler ==
Saracen first appeared in Lloyd's Register in the supplemental pages for 1819 and was listed as sailing between London and New South Wales. Various sources disagree about her launch year, place of launch, and burthen. The table below shows the information. There is enough overlap in the information to suggest that all refer to the same vessel.

Launch year	Place	Tons (bm)	Master	Owner	Source
	King's Yard	387	Kerr	Jones & Co.	LR1819
1813	King's Yard	387	Kerr	Jones & Co.	LR1820
1814	King's Yard	402	Kerr	Jones & Co.	BSWF
1812	Southampton	402		Jones	
1812	Southampton	402	Keir	Jones	Register of Shipping (1821)

Kerr sailed from Britain on 17 December 1819 with destination the New South Wales Fishery. She left Sydney for the South Sea on 16 June 1820. She left NSW again on 21 July 1821. In 1822 Saracen stopped at Uraga, Kanagawa, Japan, in where she received water, food, and firewood. On 23 January 1823 she was at 2°0′N 126°0′E with 1300 barrels of sperm oil. She returned to Britain on 22 April 1823 with 700 casks of oil.

Saracen sailed on her second whaling voyage on 18 July 1823 with Dunn, master, and destination New Zealand and Timor. She was at Boavista on 19 August, and by 20 December at the Bay of Islands, but with no cargo yet. She was reported to have visited the coast of Japan in mid-1824, and then to be at Timor in September with 900 barrels. By 2 March 1825 she was at the Cape of Good Hope. A year later, while on her way to London, Saracen was blown out of the Cape of Good Hope on 6 March 1826 during a strong gale and lost anchors. She returned to Britain on 6 July 1826.

== Fate ==
The entry in Lloyd's Register continues unchanged through 1828. However, a Saracen, Kenney, master, was reported to have been wrecked off the coast of Chile, the report appearing in Lloyd's List dated 26 August 1828. The master, crew, a woman, and four children were reported saved and to have arrived at Valdivia. An account of the wrecking adds a great deal of detail and reports that she had left Sydney on 3 February 1828, bound for Chile, and was wrecked on the coast there on 21 March 1828.

Saracen was no longer listed in the 1829 Lloyd's Register.
