= Sveti Andrija, Dubrovnik =

Island in Croatia

Sveti Andrija
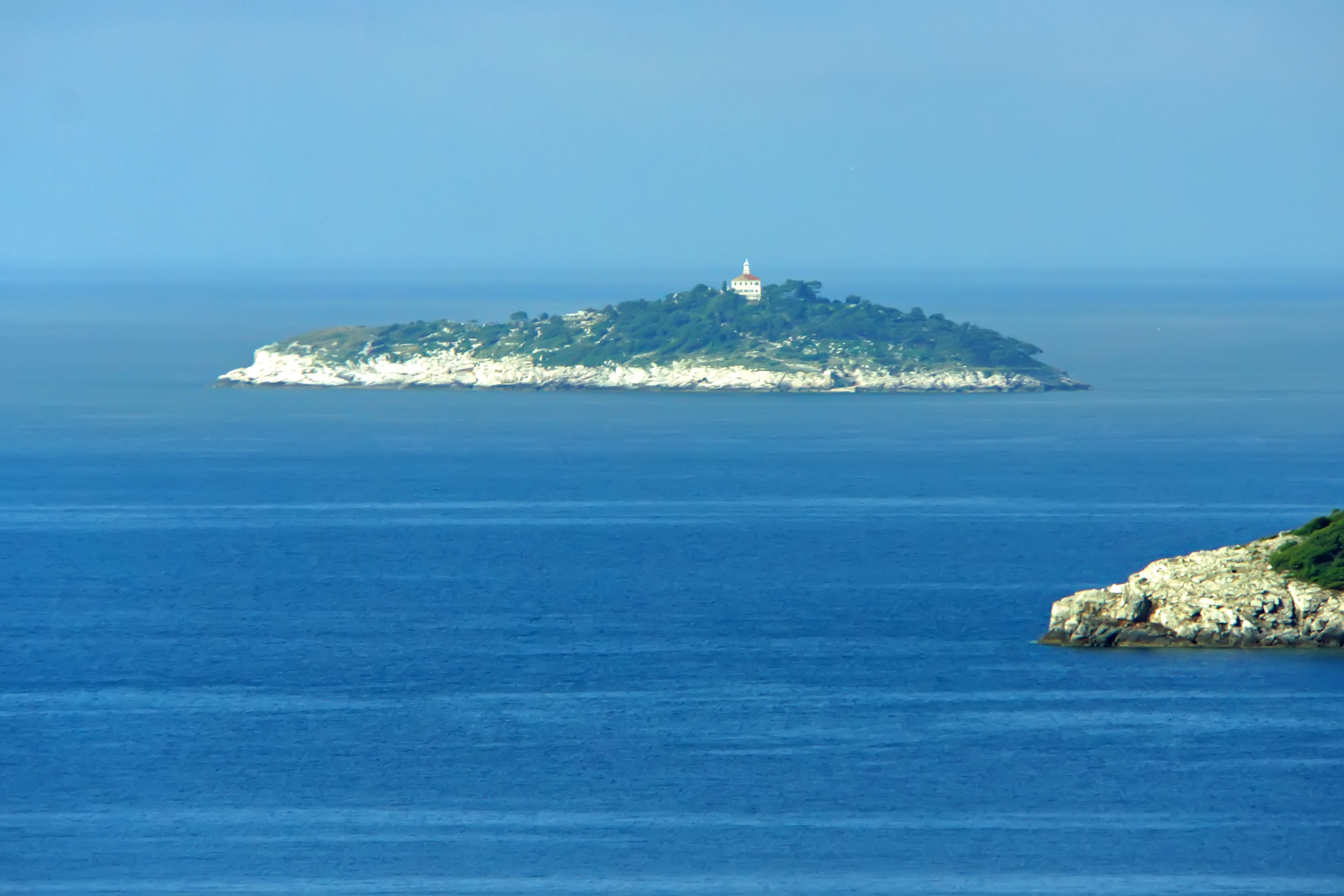

- Location within Croatia
- Interactive map of Sveti Andrija

Geography
- Location: Adriatic Sea
- Coordinates: 42°38′45″N 17°57′5″E
- Archipelago: Elaphiti Islands
- Area: 0.053 km^{2} (0.020 sq mi)
- Length: 475 m (1558 ft)
- Width: 130 m (430 ft)
- Highest elevation: 57 m (187 ft)

Administration
- Croatia
- County: Dubrovnik-Neretva County
- Sveti Andrija Lighthouse
- Coordinates: 42.646525°N 17.951387°E
- Constructed: 1873
- Construction: stone tower
- Height: 17 metres (56 ft)
- Shape: cylindrical tower with balcony and lantern rising from a 2-story keeper’s house
- Markings: unpainted white stone tower, white lantern
- Power source: solar power
- Focal height: 69 metres (226 ft)
- Range: main: 24 nautical miles (44 km; 28 mi) reserve: 12 nautical miles (22 km; 14 mi)
- Characteristic: Fl W 15s.

Sveti Andrija (Croatian for "Saint Andrew") is an island in the Croatian part of the Adriatic Sea. It is part of the Elaphiti Islands archipelago, Dalmatia and is situated 6 nautical miles (11 km) from Dubrovnik, 3 nautical miles (6 km) from Koločep, 2 nautical miles (4 km) from Lopud and 4 nautical miles (7 km) from Šipan. The island is 475 metres (1,558 feet) long, and its maximal width is 130 metres (430 feet), while its coastline is 1,130 m (3,710 ft) long. The total area of the island is 53,757 square metres (578,640 square feet), with a maximum height elevation of 57 m (187 ft) above sea level.

The shores of the island are rocky and inhospitable. The western part of the island is covered with pine forest and various Mediterranean growth. Vegetation on the rest of the island is low lying, consisting mainly of bushes. Owing to the numerous birds present, the island was declared an ornithological reserve.

== History ==
The patrician family Crijević of Ragusa built the Benedictine monastery on the island in the 15th century. The remote and isolated monastery was used for various purposes throughout its existence. At one point, it was used to quarantine the inhabitants of the island of Lopud. The monastery was destroyed during the 1667 Dubrovnik earthquake.

== Lighthouse ==
In 1873 a lighthouse was built on the island, financed by the Austro-Hungarian government. A two-storey house was built, with a masonry tower in the centre. The building has an area of 210 square metres (2,300 square feet), and a lantern room with a gallery fitted at the top of the 17 metres (56 ft) tower. The optic is a clamshell Fresnel lens. At a height of 69 metres (226 feet) above sea level, the light is visible from a distance of 24 nautical miles (44 kilometres; 28 miles), making it one of the strongest lights in the Adriatic Sea.

== Famous people on Sveti Andrija ==
Ludovik Crijević Tuberon, a historian from Ragusa (now known as Dubrovnik), lived here towards the end of 15th century. In the 16th century, Mavro Vetranović Čavčić, a famous poet from Ragusa, lived on Sveti Andrija as a monk. His poem "Remeta" details the time he spent on the island.

== Legend connected with Sveti Andrija ==
A young girl, Mare, lived with her three brothers on the island of Lopud. Her friend Cvijeta had a brother Niko who was very fond of Mare. The brothers were fishing one night and from the stormy sea they rescued a shipwreck victim, the young patrician Ivan, a member of an influential noble family from Ragusa. After Mare nursed him back to health they fell in love, but their romance was forbidden, as they came from different classes. Ivan tried his best to obtain his father's blessing, but to no avail. Disappointed, he withdrew from ordinary life and became a monk on the island of Sveti Andrija. Mare learned of this and went to the island to meet her beloved. She repeated her visits more and more often, sometimes swimming from Lopud. By the end of the summer, Sveti Andrija was not clearly visible from Lopud any more. To solve the problem of declining visibility, Ivan would light a lantern on the rock and wait for Mare while she swam towards the signal.

Niko and his brothers found out and decided to get revenge. One evening, as Mare was preparing to swim towards Sveti Andrija, Niko and his brothers were following her. When night came they lit a lantern in their boat and started rowing towards open sea. Mare was following the light further and further away. Ivan waited three nights for her arrival. On the third night, the sea threw Mare's body on the rocks. As a result, Ivan remained in the monastery for the rest of his life.

== See also ==
- List of lighthouses in Croatia

== Sources ==
- Jasprica, Nenad; Kovačić, Sanja; Ruščić, Mirko (June 2006). "Flora and vegetation of Sveti Andrija island, southern Croatia" (PDF). Natura Croatica. 15 (1–2): 27–42.
