= Tajan =

Tajan may refer to:

== People ==
- César Taján (born 1991), Colombian football player
- François Tajan (1962–2020), French auctioneer

== Places ==
- Tajan, Hautes-Pyrénées, France
- Tajan, Gilan, Iran
- Tajan Rural District, Iran
- Tajan, South Khorasan, Iran
- Tajan (Jakljan), Croatia
