= Golec =

Golec may refer to:

- Golec, Warmian-Masurian Voivodeship, village in Poland
- Goleč, islet in Croatia
- Golec uOrkiestra, Polish folk-rock group
- Antony Golec (born 1990), Australian footballer
- Vedran Golec (born 1989), Croatian taekwondo practitioner
- Szymon Golec (born 2002), Polish musician
