= Daksa =

Daksa may refer to:

- Daksha, creator god in Hinduism,
- Daksa (island), small island near Dubrovnik, Croatia.
