= Elaphiti Islands =

Archipelago in Croatia

Coordinates: 42°43′0.12″N 17°53′35.97″E

Native name: Elafitski otoci
- Aerial view of Elaphiti Islands

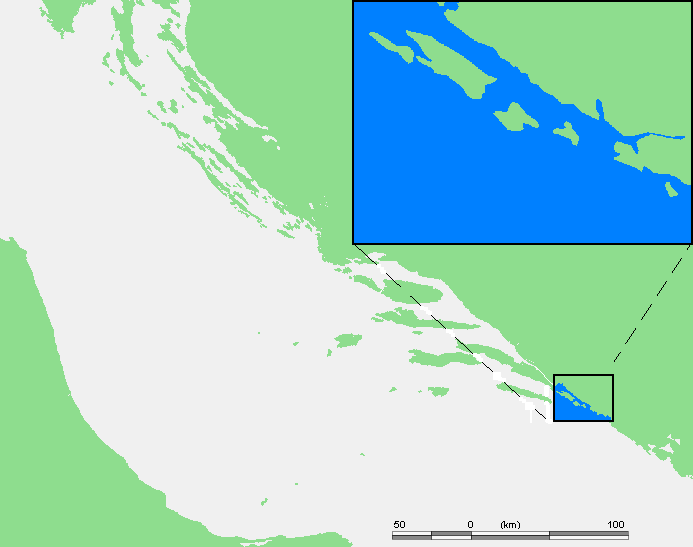

Geography
- Location: Adriatic Sea
- Archipelago: Elaphiti Islands
- Total islands: 13
- Major islands: Šipan, Lopud, Koločep
- Area: 30 km^{2} (12 sq mi)

Administration
- Croatia
- County: Dubrovnik-Neretva County
- Largest settlement: Šipan (pop. 419)

Demographics
- Population: 850

The Elaphiti Islands or the Elaphites (Croatian: Elafitski otoci or Elafiti) is a small archipelago consisting of several islands stretching northwest of Dubrovnik, in the Adriatic Sea. The Elaphites have a total land area of around 30 square kilometres (12 square miles) and a population of 850 inhabitants. The islands are covered with characteristic Mediterranean evergreen vegetation and attract large numbers of tourists in the summer season due to their beaches and pristine scenery.

Roman author Pliny the Elder was the first to mention the islands by the name Elaphiti Islands (Croatian: Jelenski otoci or Deer Archipelago) in his work Naturalis Historia, published in the 1st century. The name comes from the Ancient Greek word for deer (Doric: ἔλαφος; élaphos), which, according to Pliny the Elder, used to inhabit the islands in large numbers. There is, however, no evidence of deer ever inhabiting the archipelago.

== Islands ==
Sources differ on the exact number of the Elaphiti Islands. According to a more recent classification, there are 13 islands in the archipelago, among them eight larger (Olipa, Tajan, Jakljan, Šipan, Ruda, Lopud, Koločep and Daksa) and five smaller ones (Sveti Andrija, Mišnjak, Kosmeč, Goleč and Crkvine).

=== Main islands ===
Only the three main islands are permanently inhabited, each of which supports a modest tourist industry. They are connected with the mainland via daily ferry lines operated out of Dubrovnik.

- Šipan – the furthest and largest island in terms of area (15.8 km^{2}) and a population of 419 inhabitants. It also has two settlements, Šipanska Luka and Suđurađ, both served by Jadrolinija ferry lines.
- Lopud – the second by size and is also located between the Šipan and Koločep islands. It is well developed in terms of tourism infrastructure, including the Lafodia hotel in the town of Lopud.
- Koločep – the closest island to Dubrovnik, located 5 kilometres (3 miles) from the Dubrovnik harbour at Gruž. It used to be an important shipbuilding site during the Republic of Ragusa era. It is one of the most indented and the southernmost permanently inhabited Croatian island with a population of 163 inhabitants. It has seven pre-Romanesque churches dating from the 9th to the 11th century.

=== Other notable islands ===
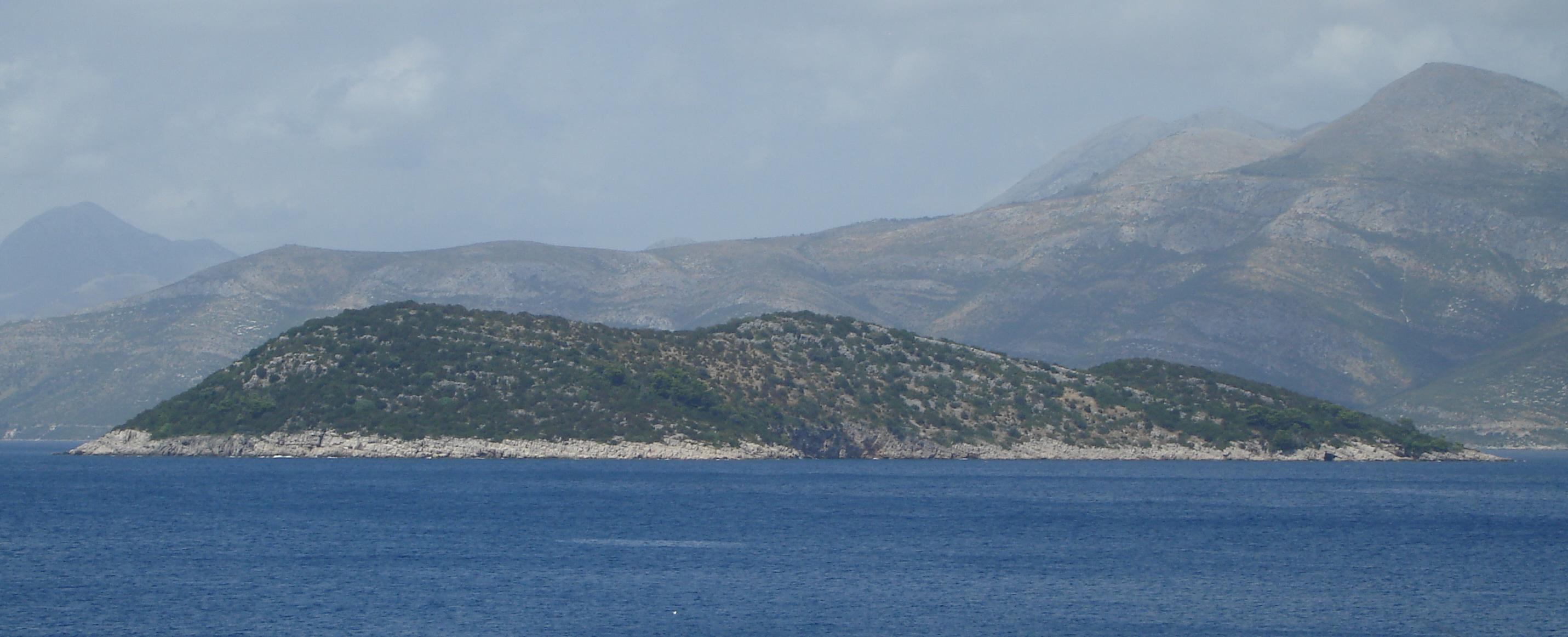
A view of Ruda Island from Lopud island.

- Crkvina – Uninhabited islet.
- Daksa – Uninhabited islet. It used to be home to a 13th-century Franciscan monastery of Saint Sabina, which was abandoned at the time of Napoleon's conquest in the early 19th century. It later became infamous as the site of the Daksa massacre, in which the partisans had executed 48 prominent citizens of Dubrovnik in October 1944.
- Goleč – Uninhabited islet.
- Jakljan – It has children’s rest and a recreation center.
- Kosmeč – Uninhabited islet.
- Mišnjak – Uninhabited islet.
- Olipa – The westernmost of the Elaphiti islands. It has a lighthouse located on its southern part.
- Ruda – Uninhabited islet.
- Sveti Andrija – Uninhabited rocky island with a rich fauna, has the status of a bird reserve. The island has a lighthouse, which the Austro-Hungarian government had built in 1873.
- Tajan – Uninhabited islet.

=== Greater Dubrovnik island ===
- Lokrum – sometimes considered part of the Elaphites, although it is not considered a part by the locals of the rest of the Elaphiti Islands.

== Bibliography ==
- Glamuzina, Martin; Glamuzina, Nikola (1999). "Suvremena geografska problematika otoka Lopuda i Koločepa" [Recent Geographical Problematics of the Lopud and Koločep Islands] (PDF). Geoadria (in Croatian). 4 (1): 89–100. doi:10.15291/geoadria.152.
