= Mišnjak =

Mišnjak is the name of several uninhabited islets in the Croatian part of the Adriatic Sea:

- Mišnjak (Rab), near the island of Rab
- Mišnjak (Šipan), near the island of Šipan in the Elaphiti Islands archipelago
- Mišnjak (Ugljan), near the island of Ugljan in the Zadar archipelago
- Mišnjak (Unije), near the island of Unije in the Cres-Lošinj archipelago
