= Ruda (island) =

Uninhabited islet in Croatia

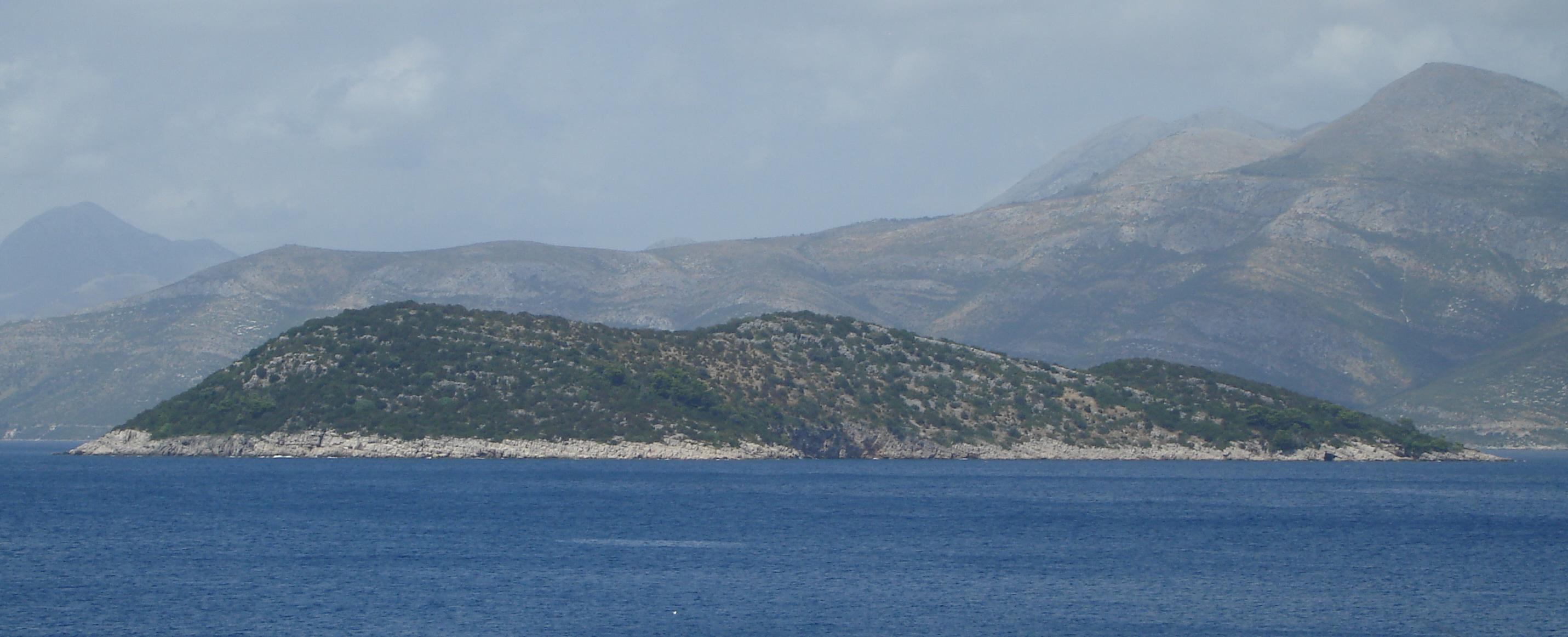
- View of Ruda as seen from Lopud
- Interactive map of Ruda

Geography
- Location: Adriatic Sea
- Coordinates: 42°42′25″N 17°55′41″E
- Archipelago: Elaphiti Islands
- Area: 0.296 km^{2} (0.114 sq mi)

Administration
- Croatia
- County: Dubrovnik-Neretva

Ruda is an uninhabited islet in Croatia, part of the Elaphiti Islands archipelago off the coast of southern Dalmatia, near Dubrovnik. It is located between the islands of Lopud and Šipan. Its area is 0.296 km^{2} and its coastline is 2.37 km long. The highest point on Ruda is 81 m high.
