= Olipa =

- Location within Croatia
- Interactive map of Olipa

Geography
- Location: Adriatic Sea
- Coordinates: 42°45′50″N 17°46′30″E
- Archipelago: Elaphiti Islands
- Area: 0.903 km^{2} (0.349 sq mi)
- Coastline: 4.99 km (3.101 mi)
- Highest elevation: 206 m (676 ft)

Administration
- Croatia
- County: Dubrovnik-Neretva County

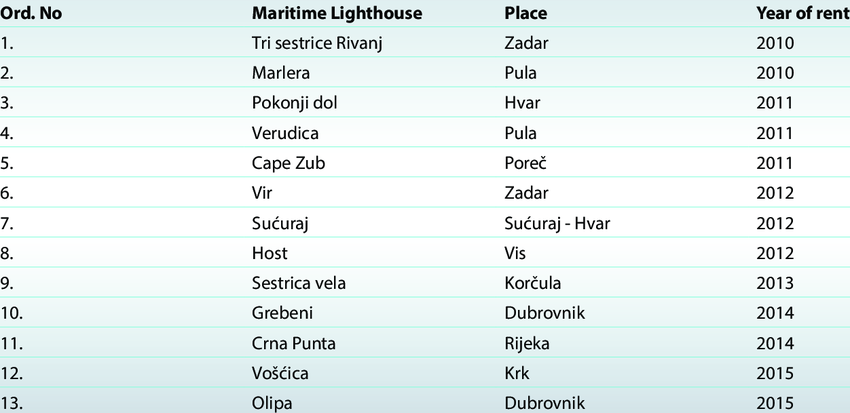
Information about the lighthouse in Olipa and other lighthouses in Croatia

Olipa is an uninhabited islet in Croatia, part of the Elaphiti Islands archipelago off the coast of southern Dalmatia. It is the westernmost isle in the Elaphites. Olipa is mostly rocky and partially covered in forest. A stone square tower is located on the south side of the isle, which serves as a lighthouse. The lighthouse is used for maritime routes passing through the passages of Veliki Vratnik (between Olipa and Tajan) and Mali Vratnik (between Olipa and Pelješac).

Olipa's area is 0.903 square kilometres (0.349 sq mi) and its coastline is 4.99 kilometres (3.10 mi) long. The highest point on Ruda is 206 metres (676 ft) high.
