= Crkvina (island) =

Island in Croatia

- Interactive map of Crkvina

Geography
- Location: Adriatic Sea
- Coordinates: 42°45′06″N 17°48′36″E
- Archipelago: Elaphiti Islands
- Area: 0.1 km^{2} (0.039 sq mi)

Administration
- Croatia
- County: Dubrovnik-Neretva

Crkvina is an uninhabited islet in Croatia, part of the Elaphiti Islands archipelago off the coast of southern Dalmatia, near Dubrovnik. Its coastline is 1.5 km (0.93 mi) long.
