= Petar Perica =

Croatian Catholic priest (1881–1944)

Petar Perica, SJ (27 June 1881, in Kotišina near Makarska – 25 October 1944, in Daksa) was a Croatian Catholic priest and a member of the Jesuits. He authored the hymns "Zdravo Djevo" and "Do nebesa nek se ori".

He was born in 1881 in Kotišina near Makarska. He finished elementary school in Makarska. He continued his education in 1895 in Travnik. After Pope Leo XIII consecrated the world to the Sacred Heart in 1899, in Croatia an initiative was launched with the help of Perica intended to draw Croatian youth to dedicate themselves to the Sacred Heart. A brochure was released to this purpose, which included Perica's "Do nebesa nek se ori", which remains one of the most popular Croatian liturgical songs.

In 1900, a Croatian pilgrimage to Rome was held, during which Perica and Franjo Scholz gave to Pope Leo XIII an album containing the signatures of over 160,000 Croatian youth. In 1901 Perica became a Jesuit. Per the Ustaše Commissioner of Dubrovnik, Ivo Rojnica, Perica assisted in the establishment of the Ustaše organization in Dubrovnik. In October 1944, Perica was murdered by Yugoslav Partisans on the island of Daksa, near Dubrovnik. In 2010, a funeral was held and his remains were buried in 2010.

In 2017, he was posthumously given City of Durbrovnik's lifetime achievement award by Dubrovnik City Council.

== See also ==
- Daksa executions
