= Kosmeč =

Island in Dubrovnik-Neretva County, Croatia

- Interactive map of Kosmeč

Geography
- Location: Adriatic Sea
- Coordinates: 42°44′46″N 17°49′24″E
- Archipelago: Elaphiti Islands
- Area: 0.024 km^{2} (0.0093 sq mi)

Administration
- Croatia
- County: Dubrovnik-Neretva

Kosmeč is an uninhabited islet in Croatia, part of the Elaphiti Islands archipelago off the coast of southern Dalmatia, near Dubrovnik. Its area is 0.024 km^{2} and its coastline is 0.57 km long.
