= Lopud =

Small island off the coast of Dalmatia, southern Croatia

Coordinates: 42°41′N 17°57′E

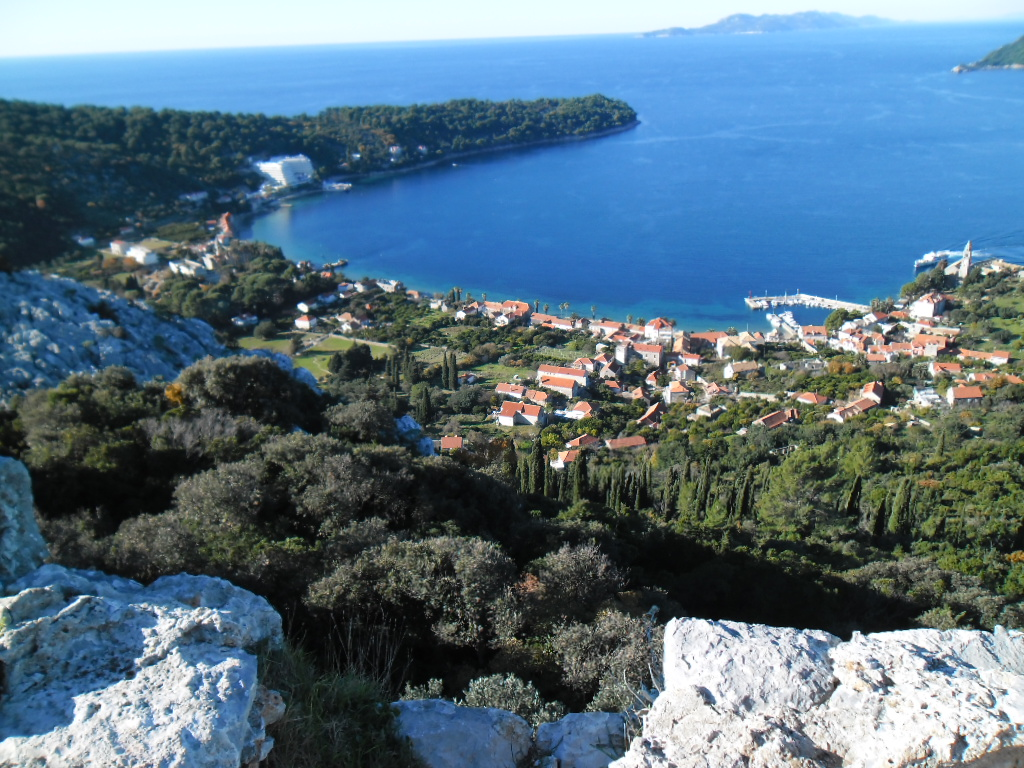
- View from Sutvrač Fort

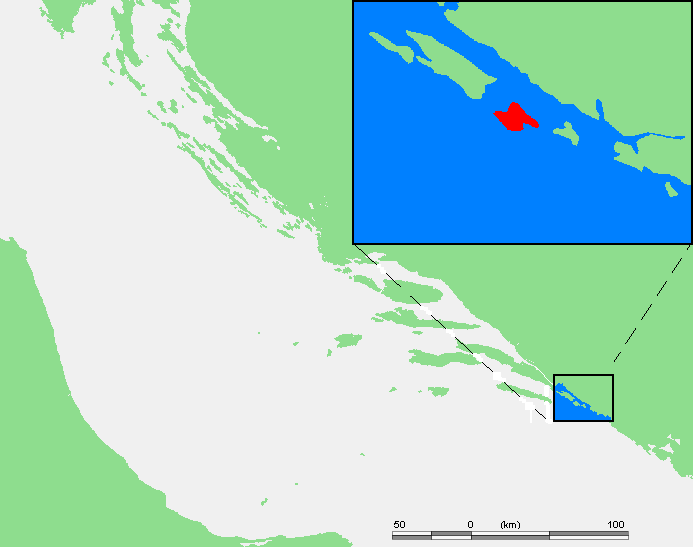

- Location within Croatia

Geography
- Location: Adriatic Sea
- Archipelago: Elaphiti Islands
- Area: 4.63 km^{2} (1.79 sq mi)
- Highest elevation: 214 m (702 ft)
- Highest point: Polačica

Administration
- Croatia
- County: Dubrovnik-Neretva County

Demographics
- Population: 278 (2021)
- Pop. density: 60.04/km^{2} (155.5/sq mi)

Lopud (pronounced [lɔ̌pud]) is a small island off the coast of Dalmatia, southern Croatia. Lopud is economically the most developed of the Elaphiti Islands, and can be reached by boat from Dubrovnik, Trsteno, Orašac and Zaton. The island is famous for its sandy beaches, in particular the bay of Šunj. Lopud is the second largest island of the Elaphiti islands, between Koločep and Šipan. It is famous as the "island in the middle" (Insula Media, or Mezzo). It has an area of 4.63 square kilometres (1.79 square miles) and its highest point is Polačica, 216 metres (709 feet) above sea level. It has 11.5 km (7 mi) of coastline, of which 1.2 km (1 mi) is sandy.

== History ==
The central island known as Elaphite (Deer) archipelago, is 7 nautical miles away from Dubrovnik and with an area of 4.6 square kilometers. It was a frequent station of ancient Greeks and later Romans. There is no substantial proof, but the Greek name Delaphodia for present Lopud as well as Igalo for the waterfront (promenade) suggests the early presence of Greeks on the island. In the 9th century, the island was inhabited by Slavs, a fact supported by four old Slavonic churches and a bulk of archaeological finds. Very early (prior to the 10th century) it became part of the Commune of Dubrovnik, eventually becoming a county within the Republic of Ragusa. Due to its central location, Lopud gets the name of Isola di Mezzo. The 15th and 16th centuries were the Golden Age for the island. Thanks to the prospering shipping industry and sea trade (even with the Americas), as well as shipbuilding and agriculture, the island was a highly cultured one. The well-educated monks of the Franciscan (1483) and Dominican (1482) monasteries made way for literacy on the island. In addition to elementary school, the Dominicans taught the first three grades of high school in their curriculum. It is generally considered that the island's seamen received the basic knowledge in navigation they were to use during their successful voyages. Palaces and mansions were erected. The names of Lopud's streets, as well as its many houses and over thirty churches and chapels, each tell a story of the town of Lopud.

The Ragusa Republic was reinforced by the island's eighty ship merchant fleet, both in war and in peace. Writers and poets alike were so impressed with Lopud at that period that they presented it as a city with a population of 14 thousand. The history of Lopud regrettably has not been explored thoroughly. However, judging by currently available documents, the island at its peak had around two thousand inhabitants. For comparison, in 2010 only 200 people inhabit the island. From the 17th century on, its economic power began to decline along with population. In the last three centuries, the island's population fluctuated between 600 and 350. In the 1990's, 284 people lived on the island. The conquest by Napoleon in 1808 brought an end to the monasteries' activities. During the Austro-Hungarian rule, Lopud's inhabitants subsisted on fishing, agriculture, sailing on merchant ships, and working abroad, particularly in the USA.

On 22 July 1813, marines and seamen from HMS Saracen and HMS Weazel captured the French garrison on the island, which consisted of six guns and 59 men.

In addition to the basic local occupations, the 19th and the beginning of the 20th centuries introduced textile production. With over 50 looms, Lopud turned into a center of industry for the area. This economic activity helped further the emancipation of Lopud's women, too. The areas that are, today, overgrown with vegetation were, only 80 years ago, dominated by olive-groves, producing enough olives to make use of 19 olive mills.

From 1927 to 1990, tourism was a substantial part of the economy, and the island's population enjoyed a safe and stable period. After WWII, all privately owned hotels were confiscated and became state property. In the last few years, the buildings of the "Hoteli Lopud" enterprise have taken on 90 permanent employees, hiring more during the summer. The improved standard of living saw construction of newly built stone houses and flats in Dubrovnik. During the aggression against the Republic of Croatia from 1991 to 1995, business was operating under war-time conditions, resulting in the eventual bankruptcy. The so-called "privatization," that is to say, the sell-off of the hotels and real estate, as well as devastation, unemployment and job insecurity, has led to population decrease and the young people of Lopud looking elsewhere for opportunities. Despite the natural resources and potentiality of comfortable life, since 1992 Lopud has been passing the saddest period in its long history.

Starting in 2021, Lopud serves as the host of the Ponta Lopud Film Festival, founded by Tilda Grossel Bogdanović. The festival takes place in June or July and has featured filmmakers such as Joel Coen and Paweł Pawlikowski. In 2023, the Ponta Lopud Jazz Festival debuted under the creative direction of Thana Alexa. This festival takes place in August. Starting in 2024, a Book Bridge Festival takes place in September.

Lopud made history on May 14,2026 as the first location in Croatia where a United States divorce took place via WebEx.

== Demographics ==
According to the 2021 census, its population was 278.

== Gallery ==
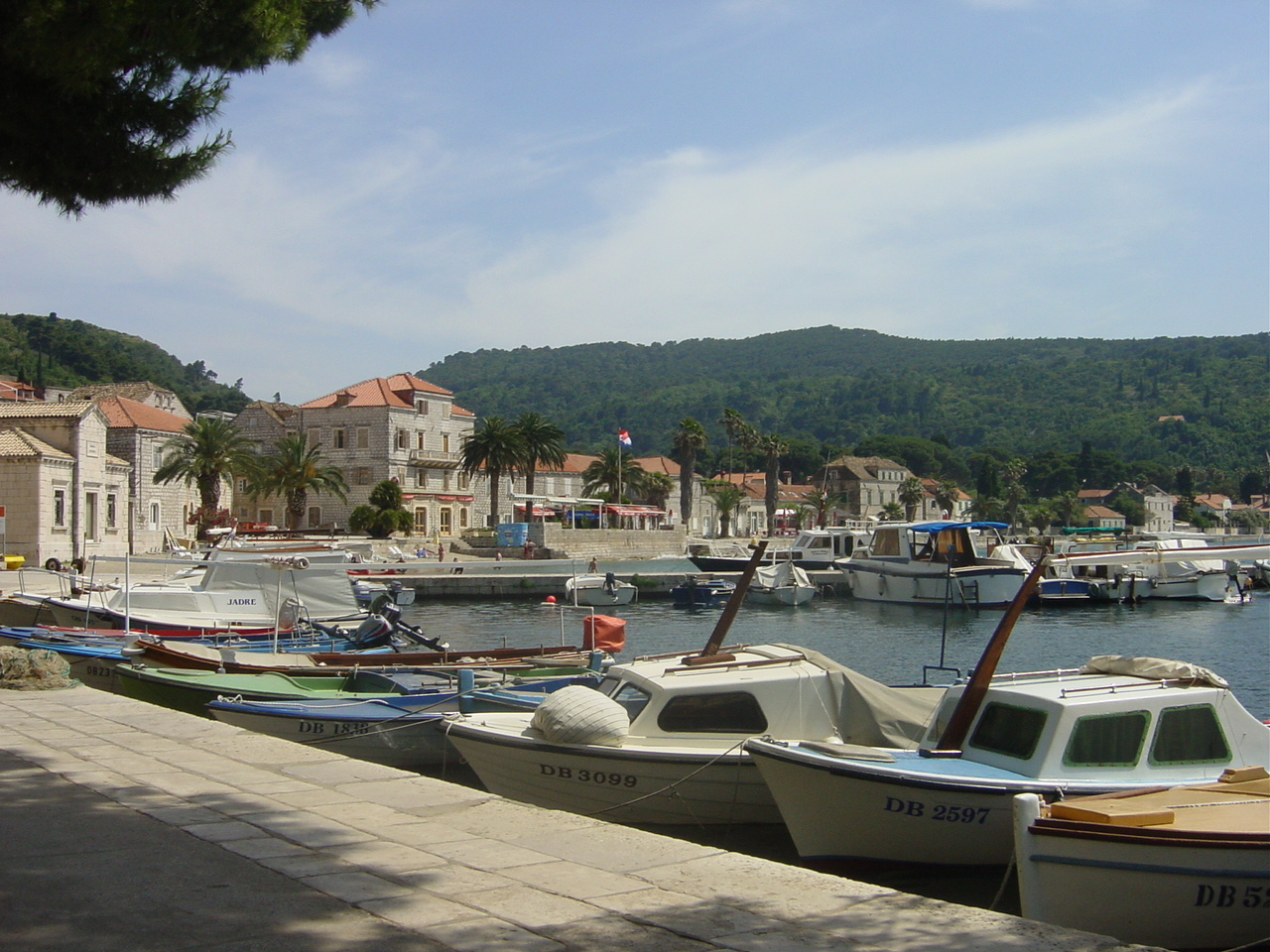
The harbour in Lopud

Lopud beach scene

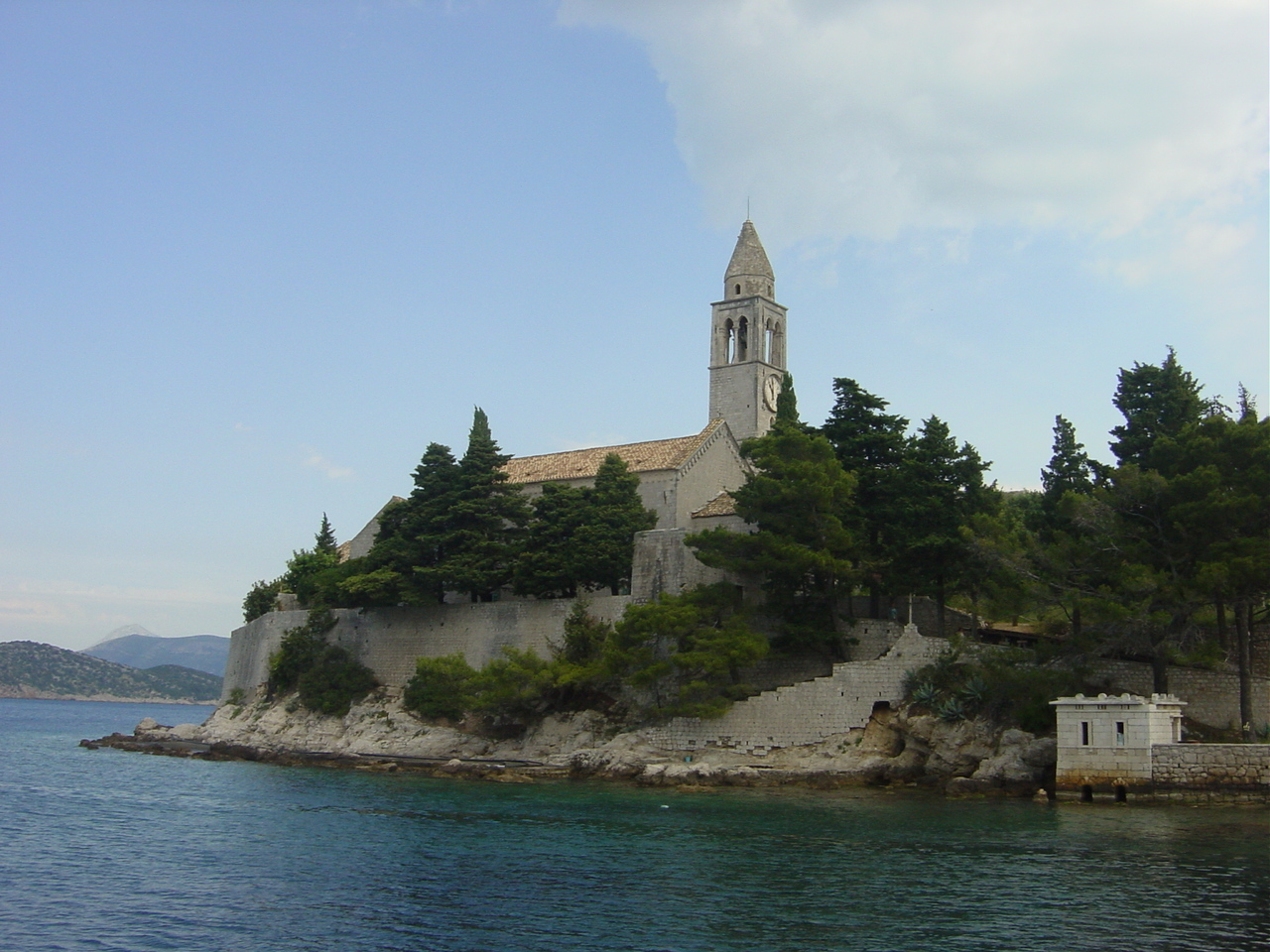
Franciscan monastery

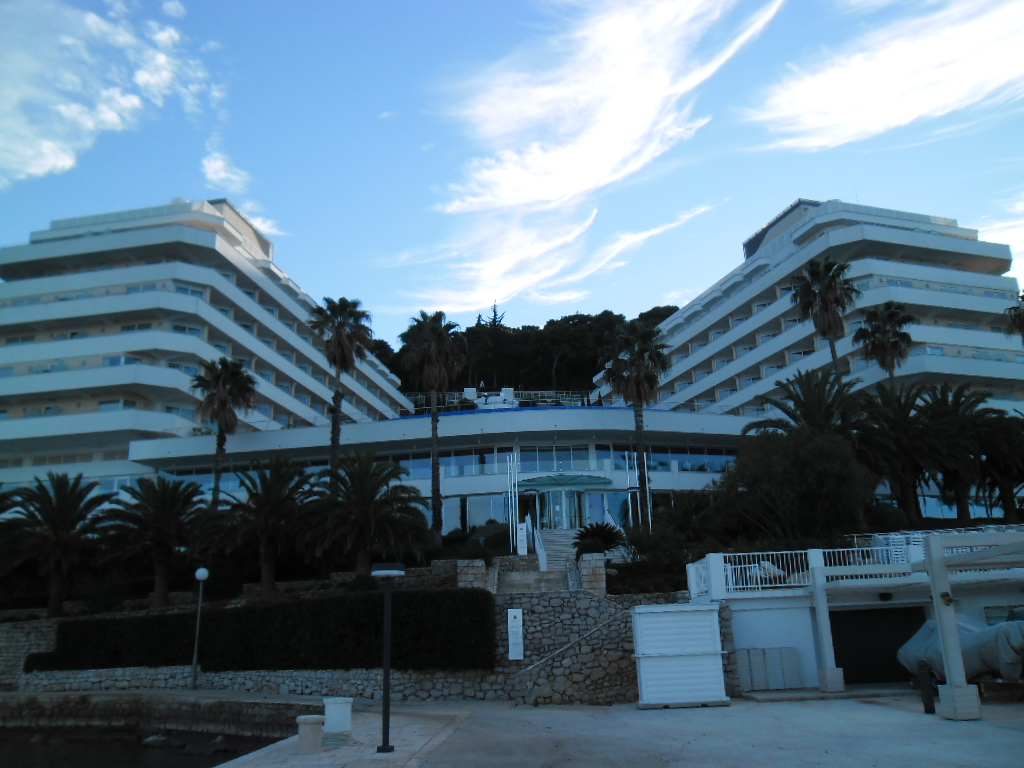
Hotel Lafodia (opened 1968)

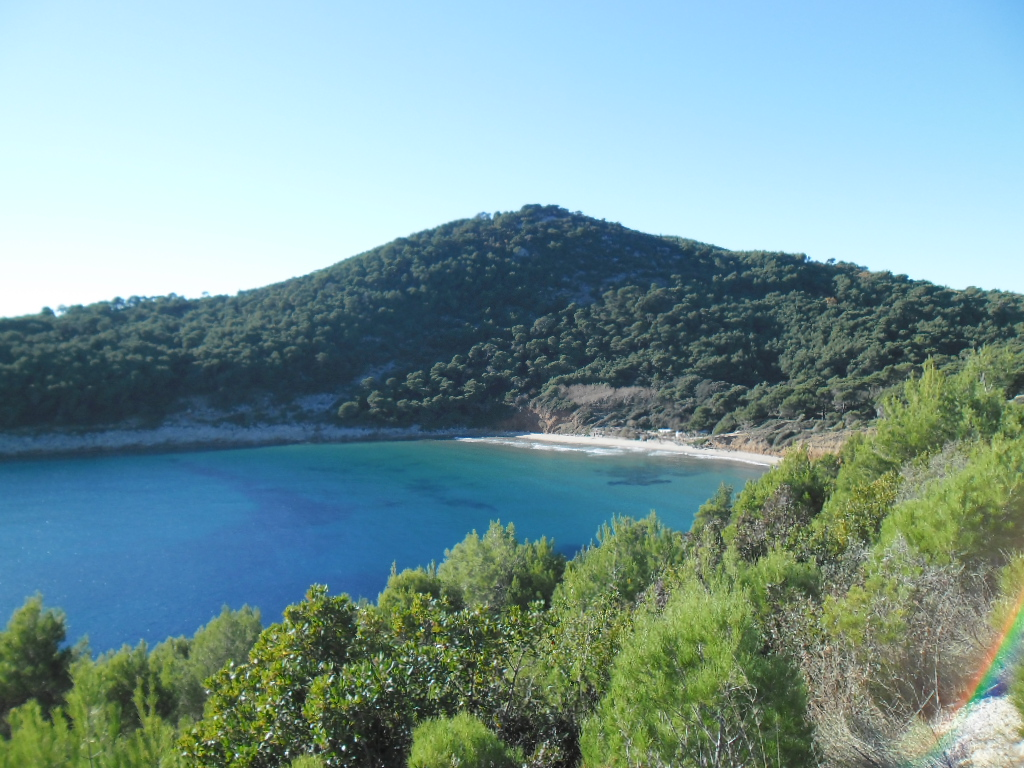
Šunj Beach

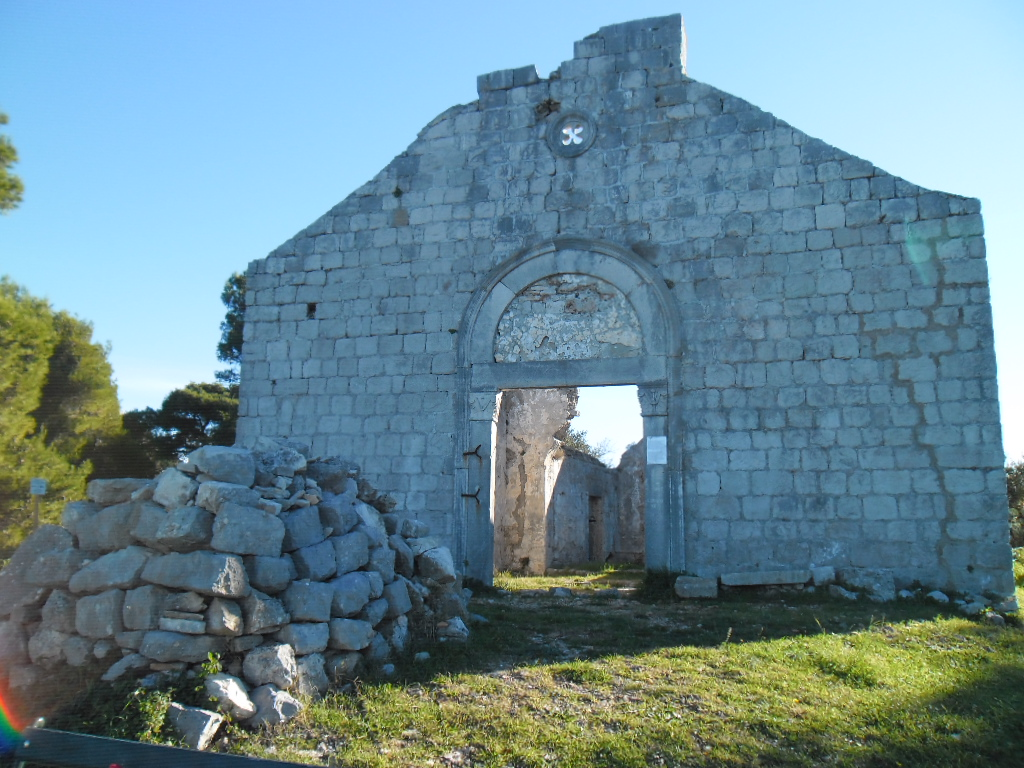
St. John's Church on Belvedere

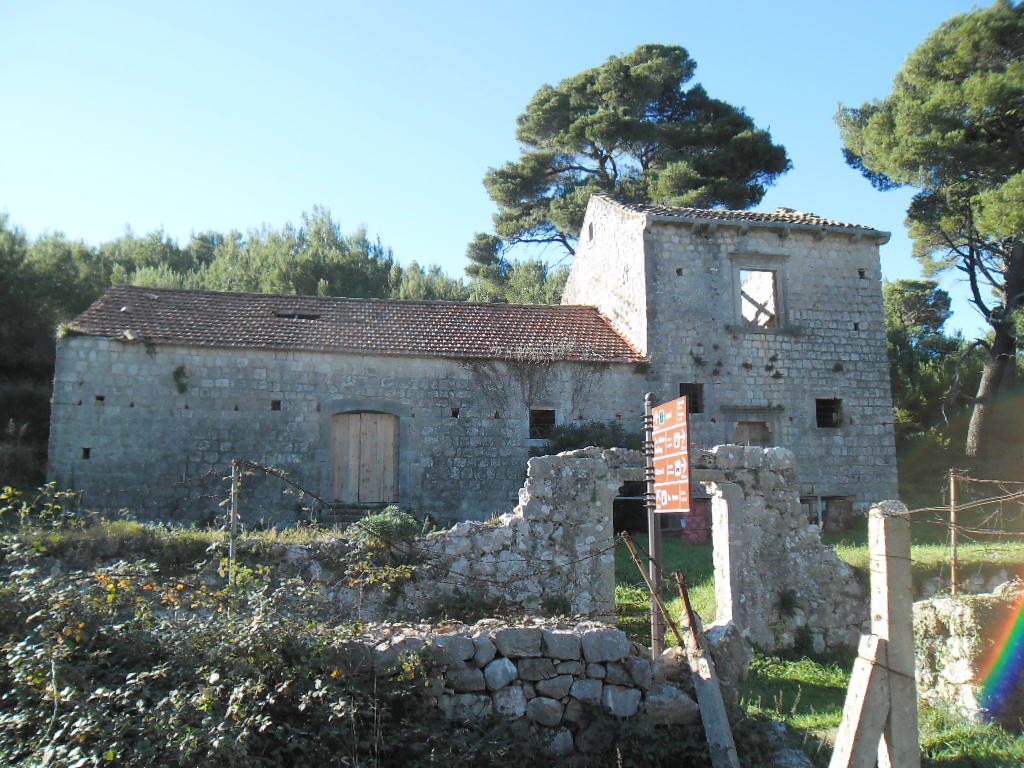
Derelict house

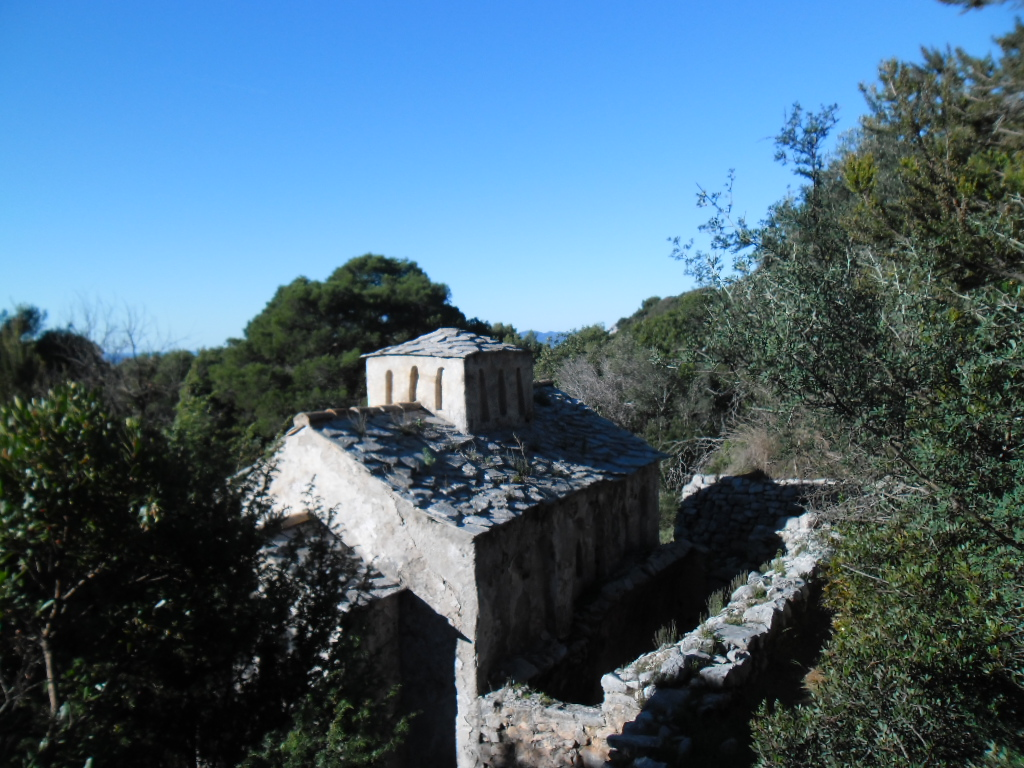
Chapel

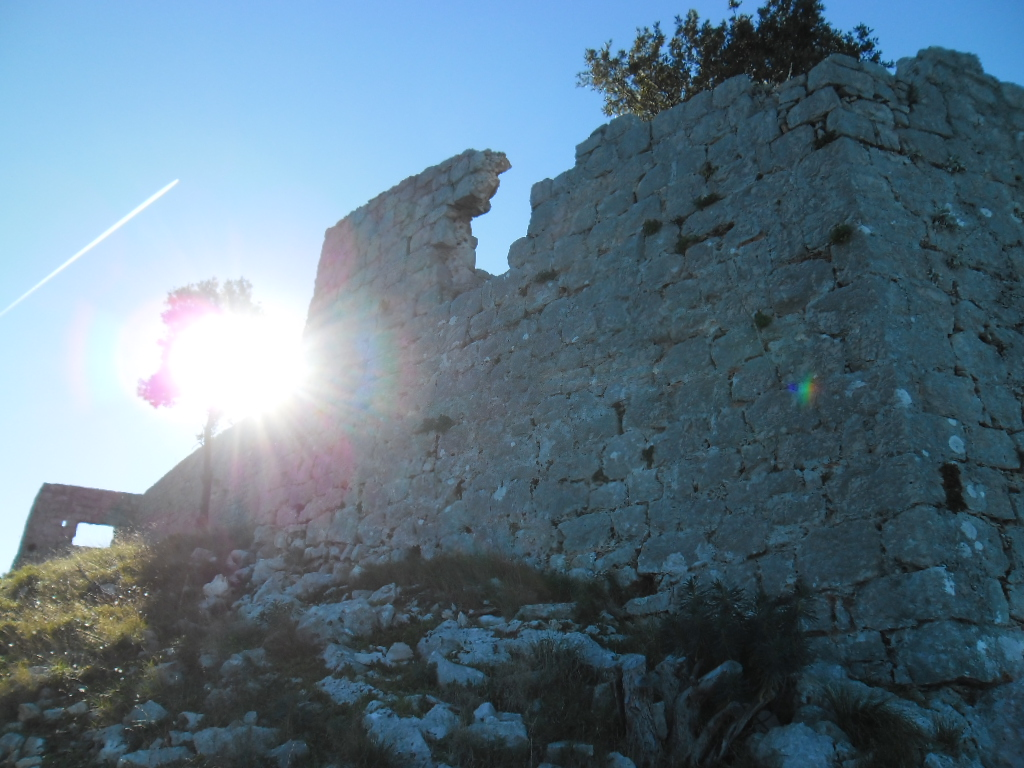
Spanish fort Sutvrač

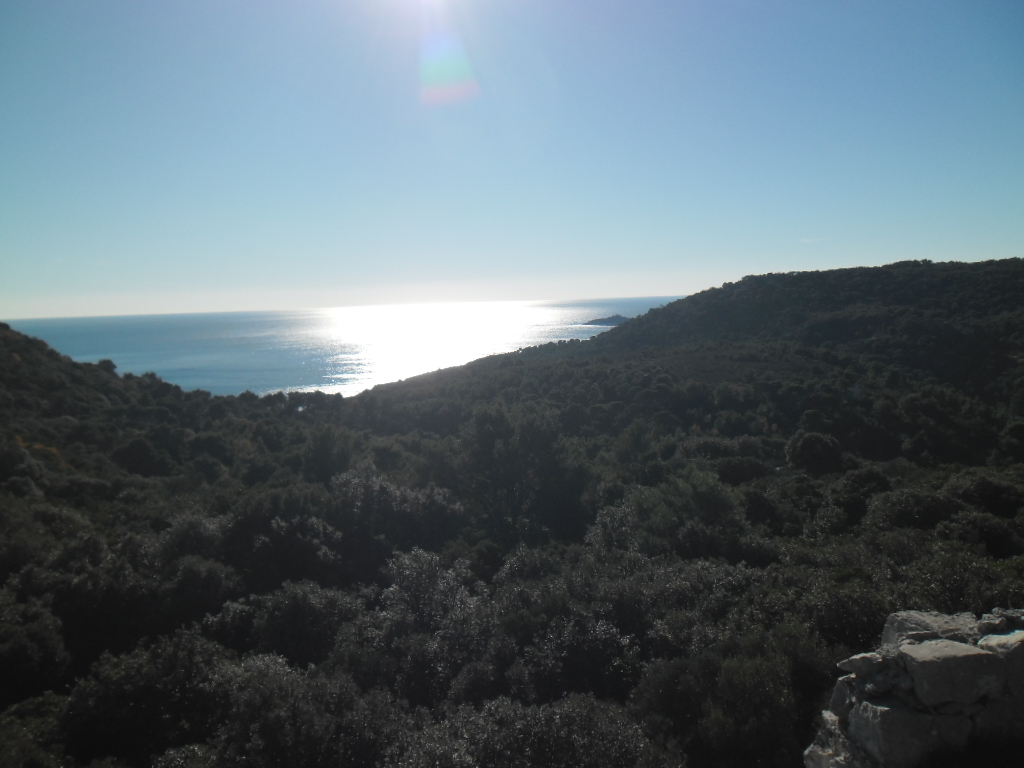
View on Lopud forests from Sutvrač

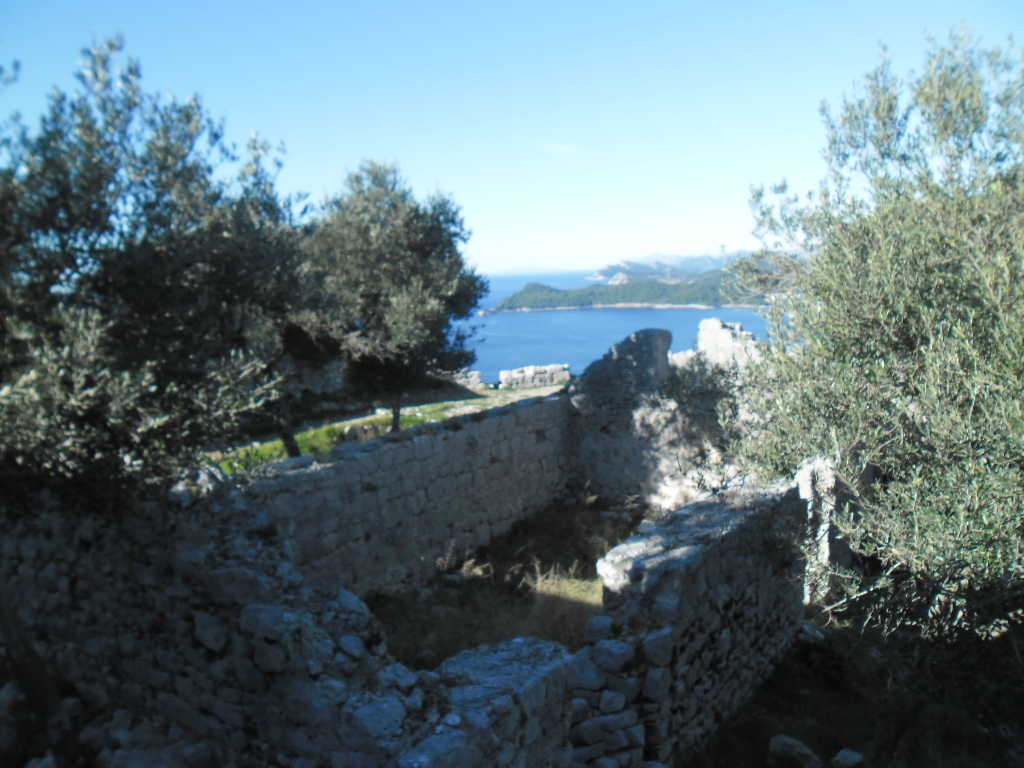
Interior of Sutvrač Fort

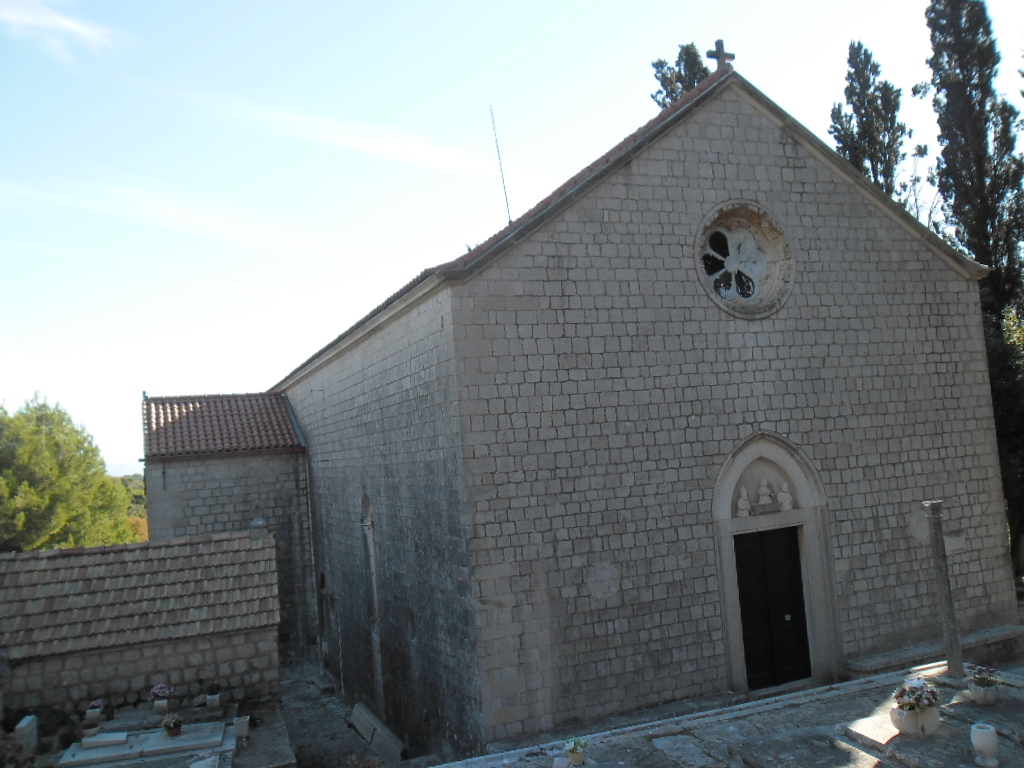
Lady of Šunj Church

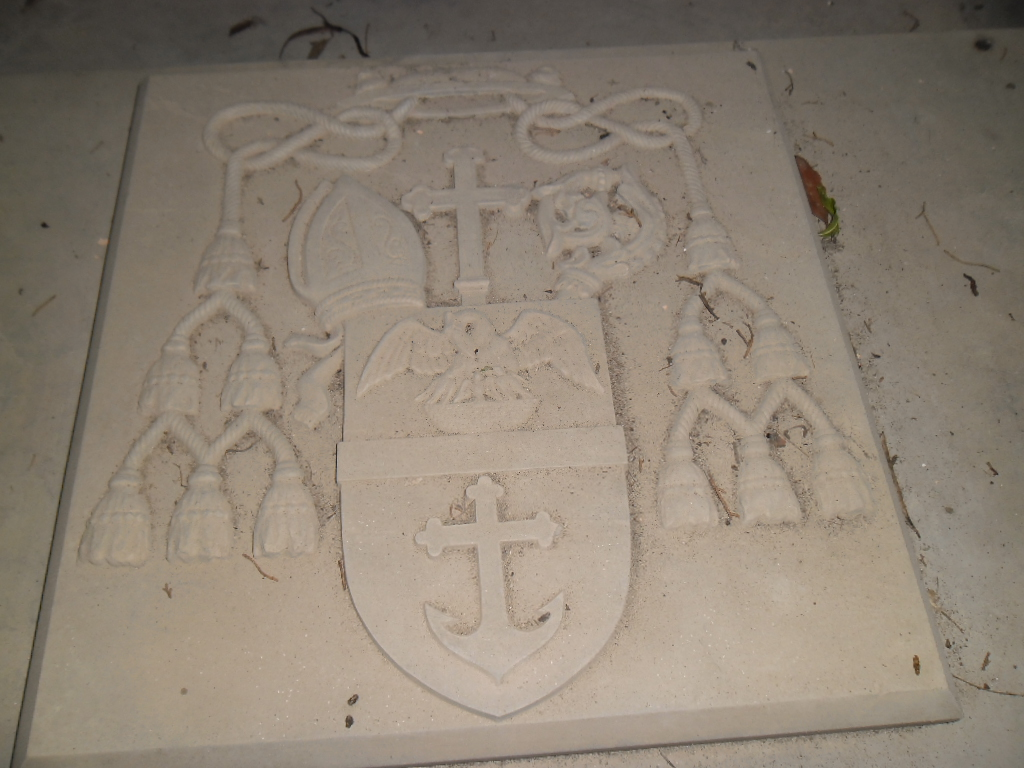
Tombstone in the chapel beside Lady of Šunj Church

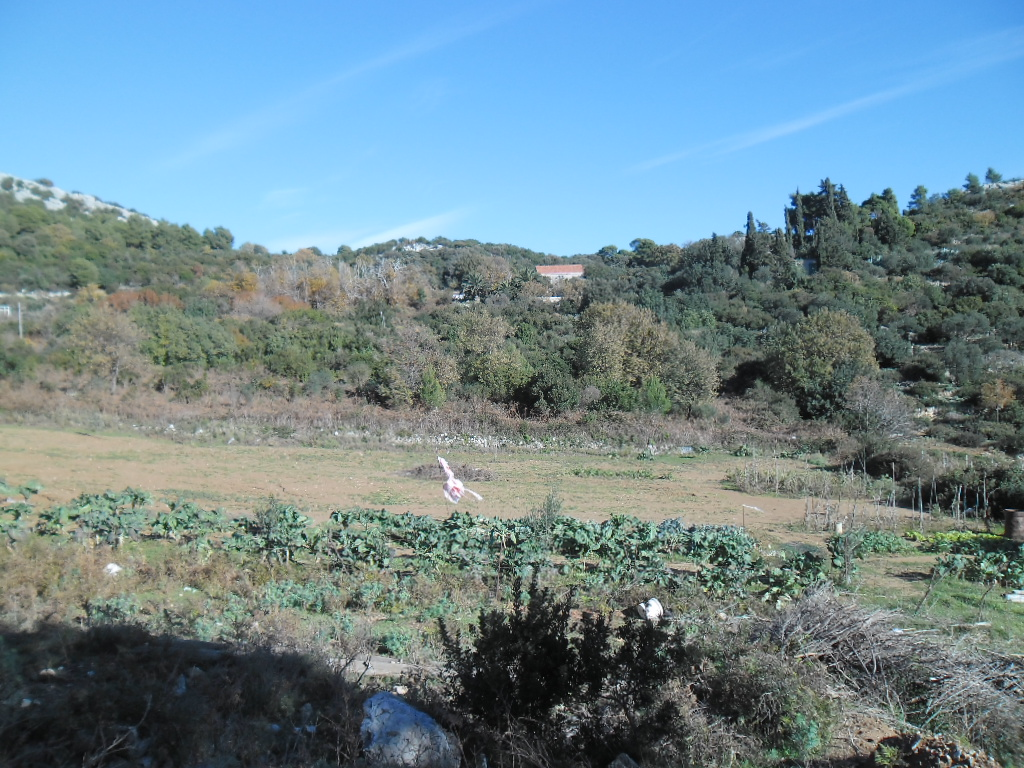
Lopud landscape

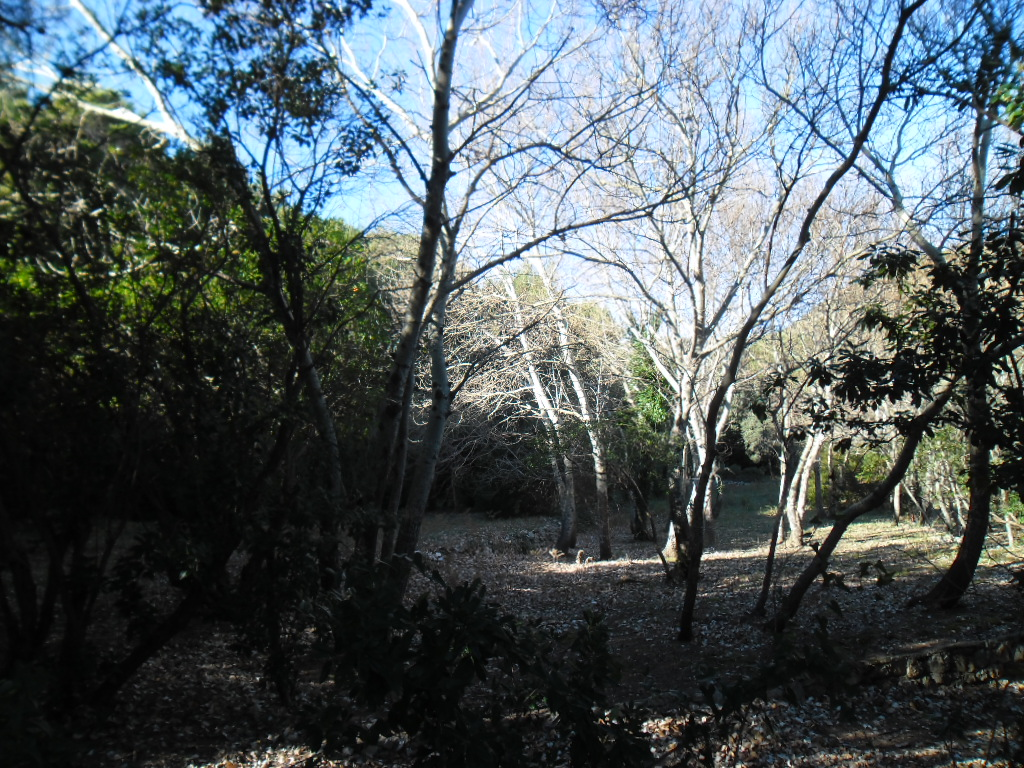
Above Šunj Beach

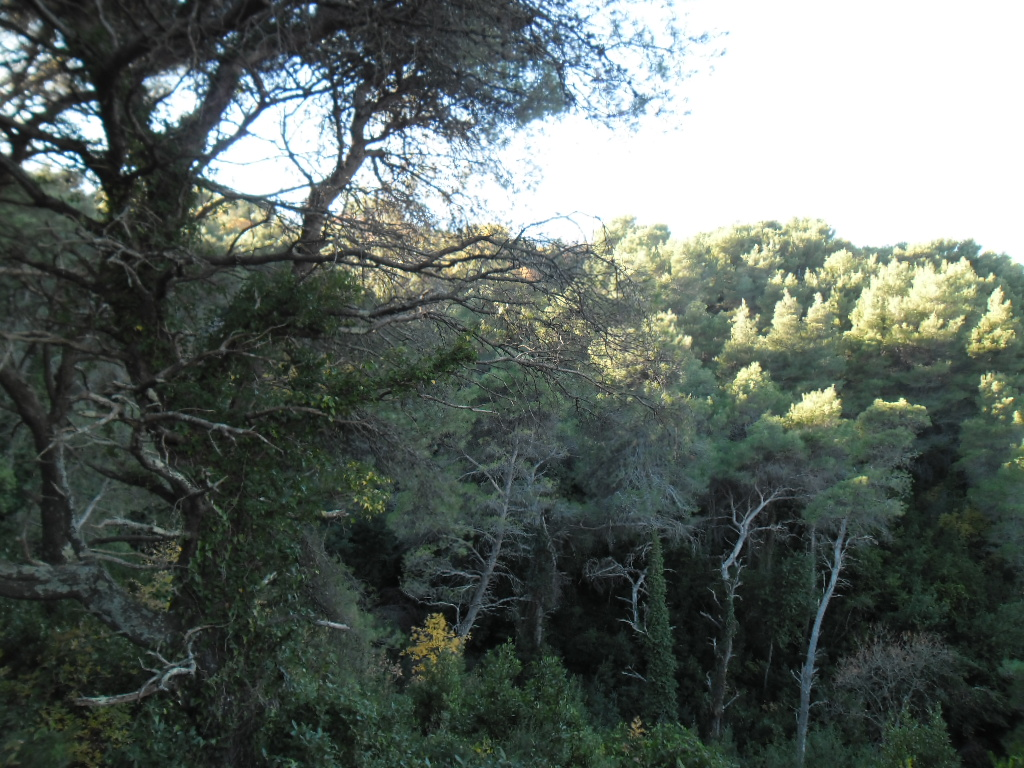
Along the footpath

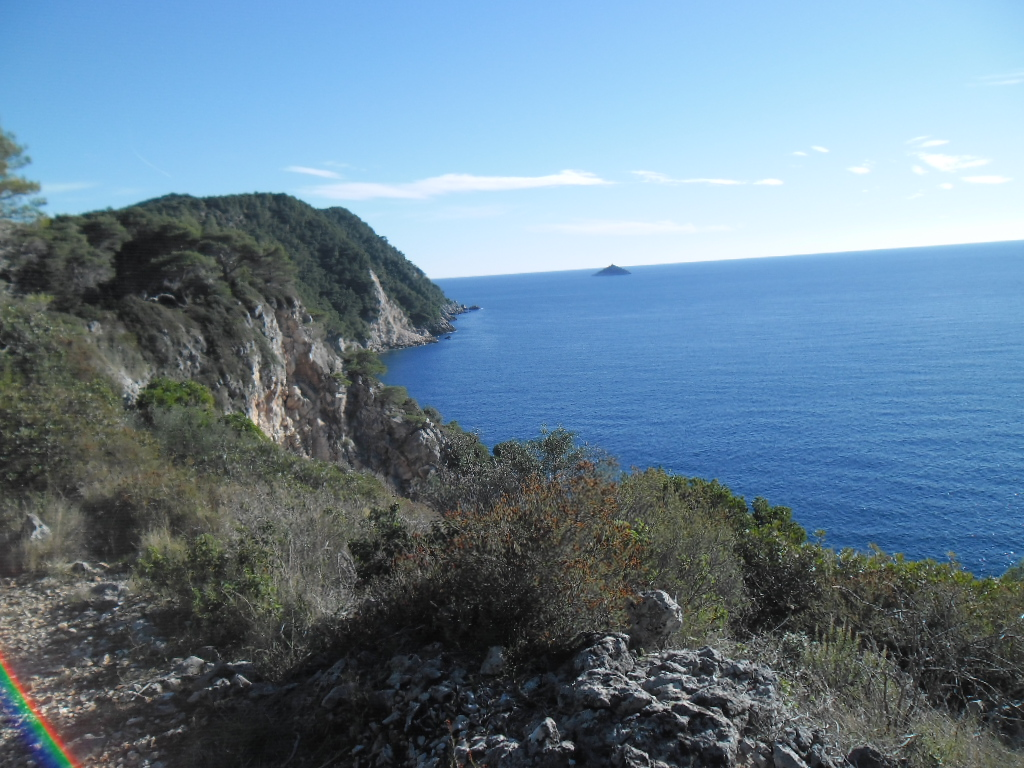
Other side of the island

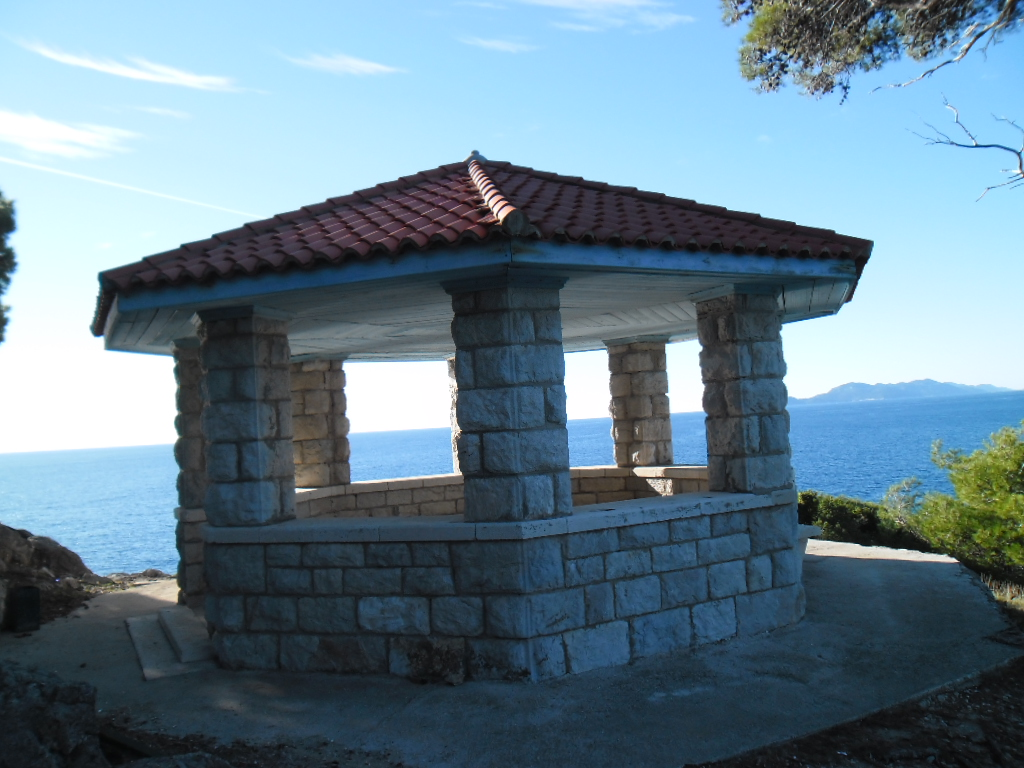
Small belvedere

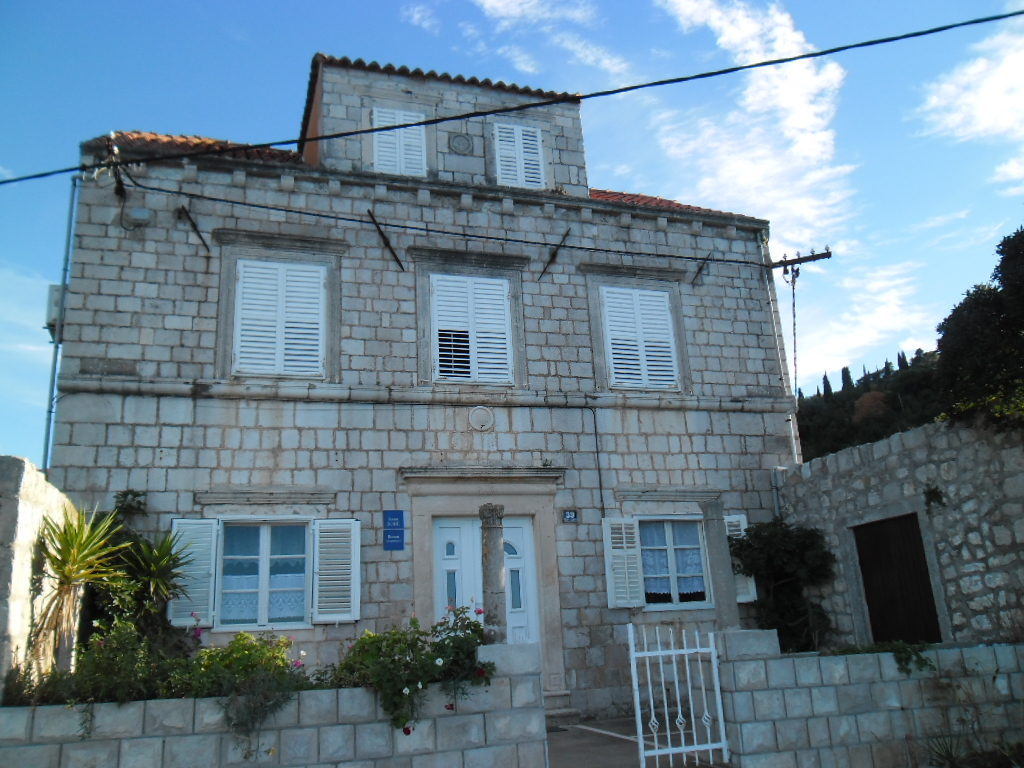
One of houses in town

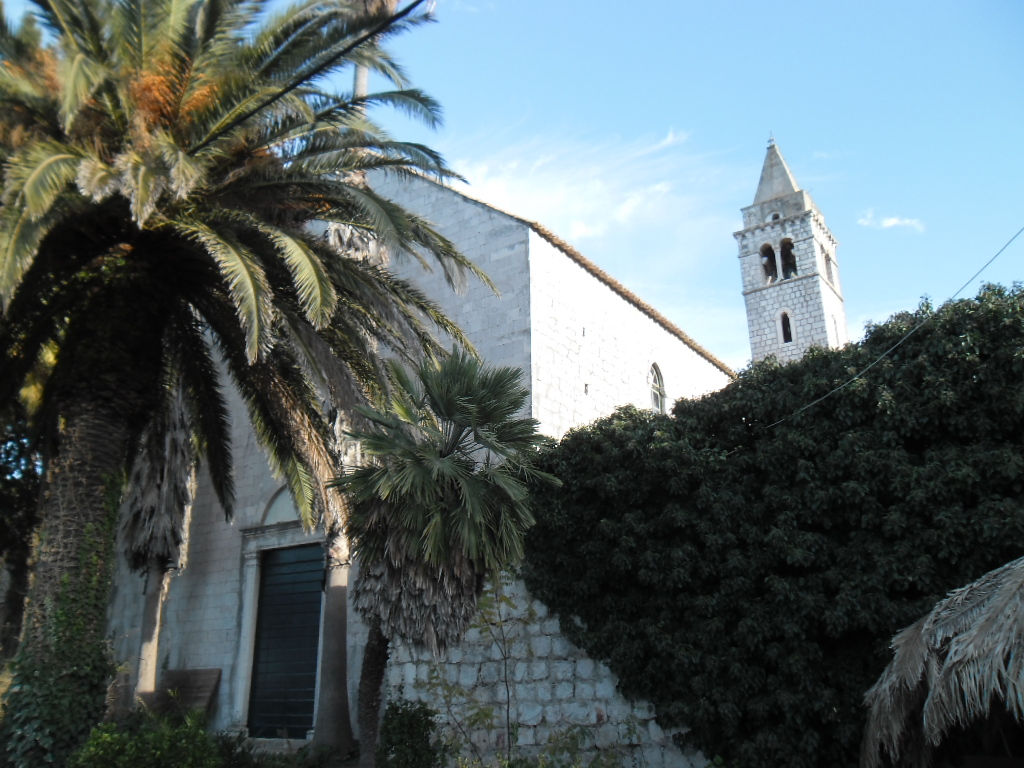
Church in town

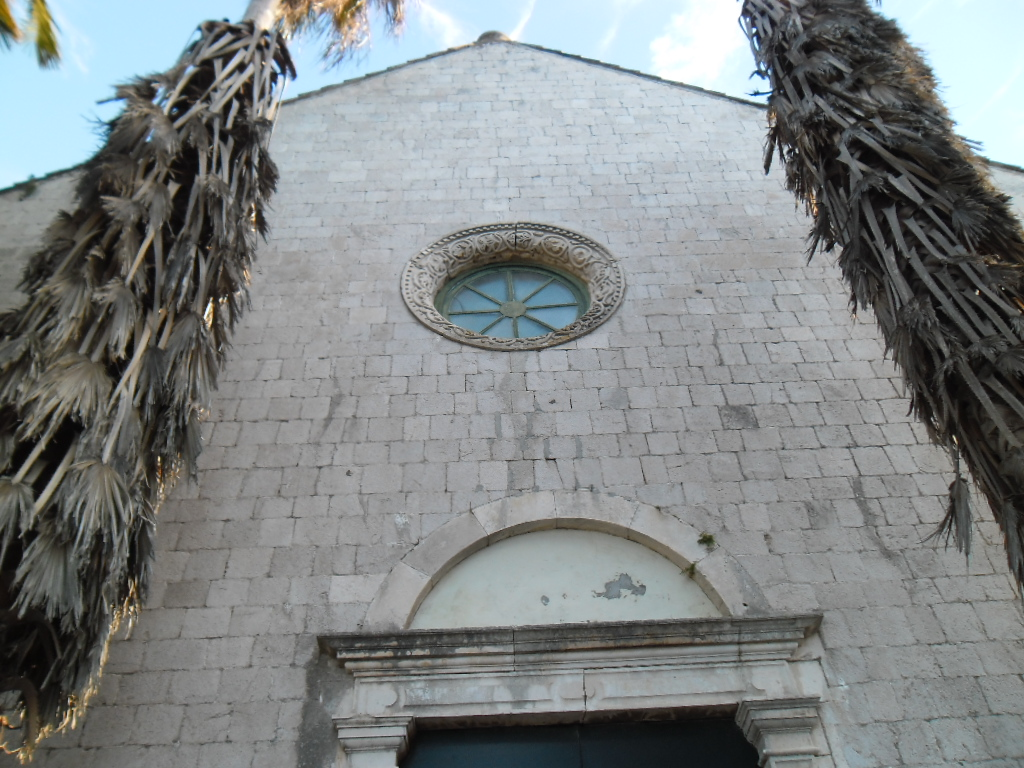
Doors of church in town

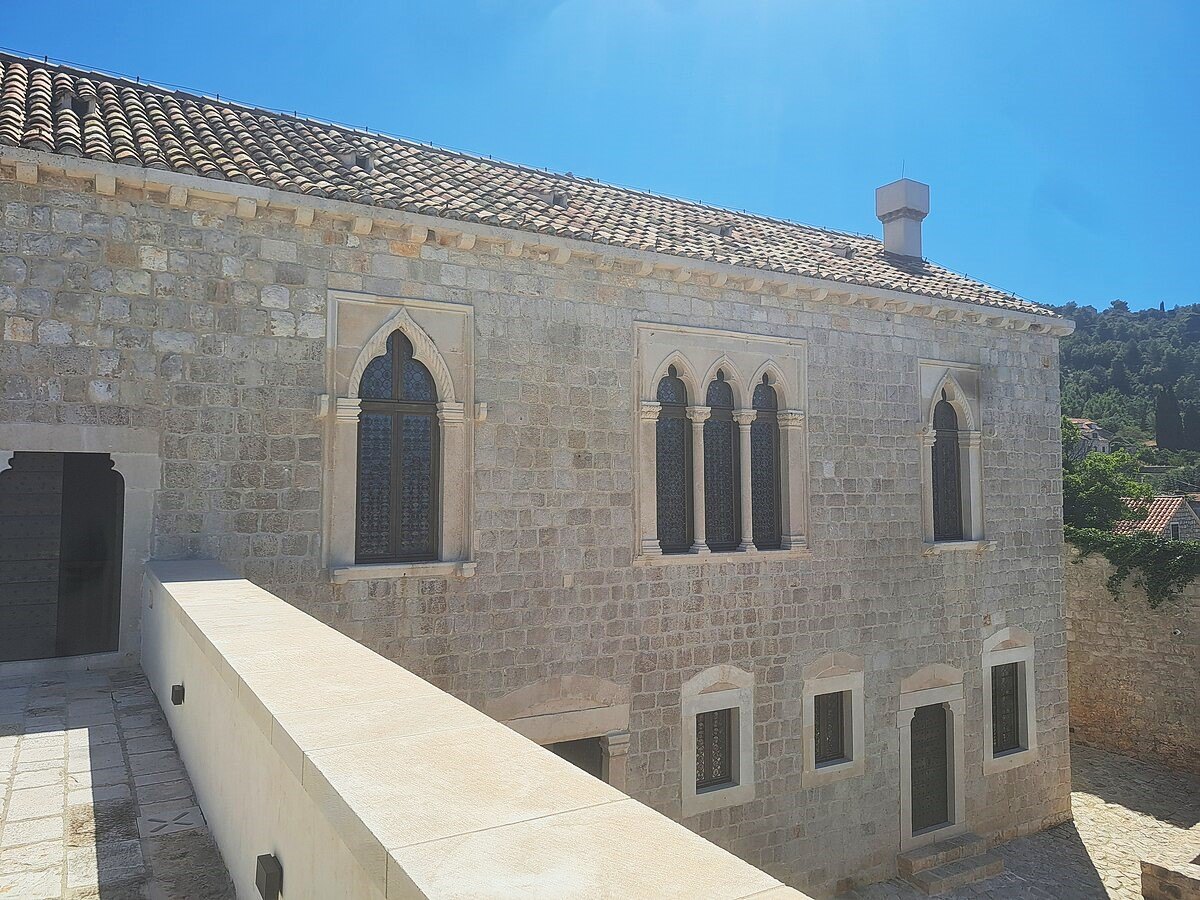
Rector's palace, reconstructed in the early 2020s

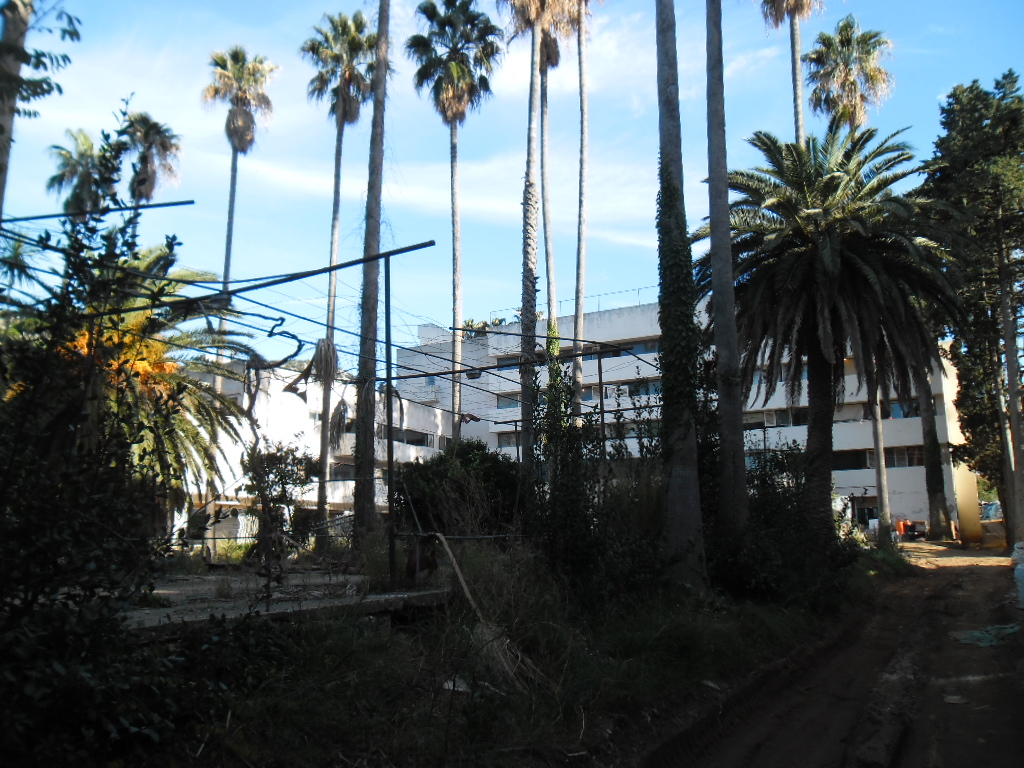
Former hotel Grand

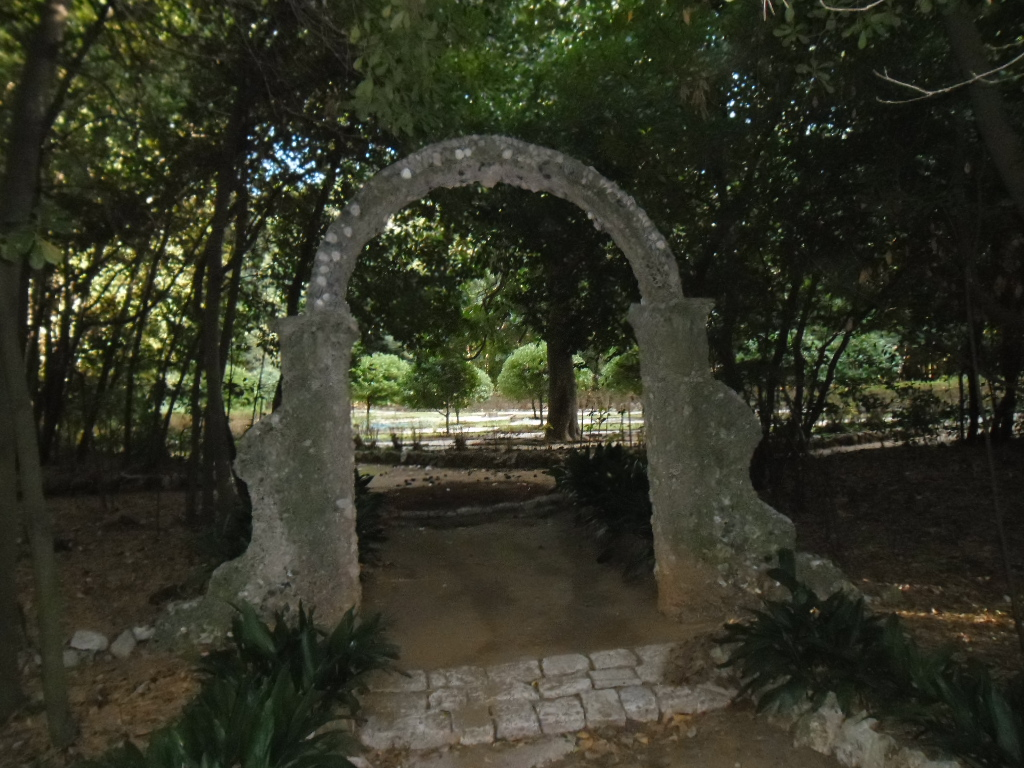
Lopud botanical park

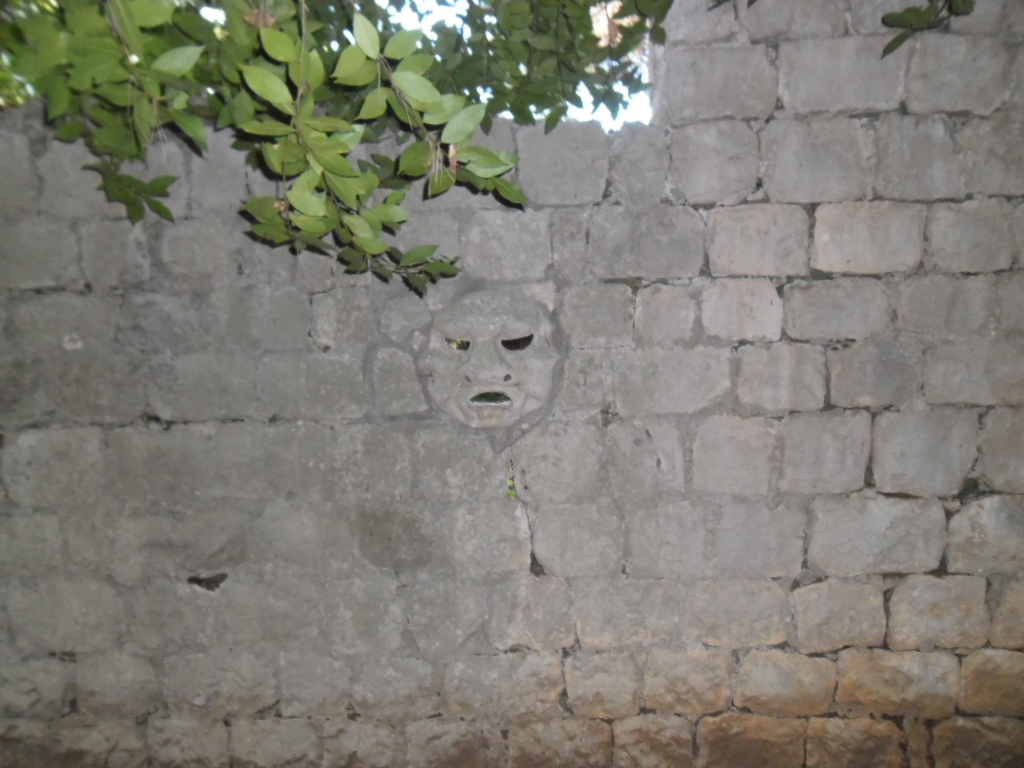
Image from the park

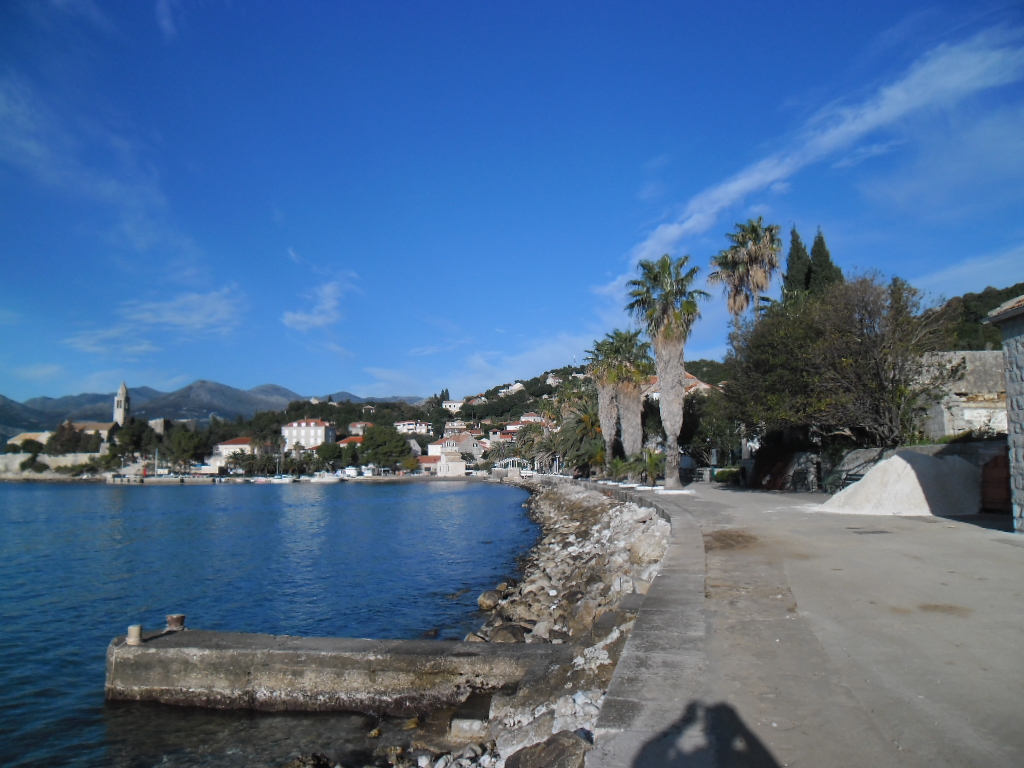
Town seafront
