= Daksa (island) =

Island

Coordinates: 42°40′06″N 18°03′25″E

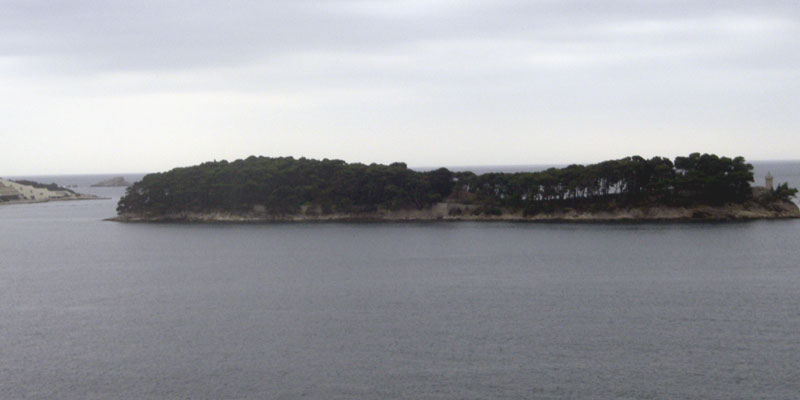
Daksa in 2007

Daksa is a small uninhabited island in the Croatian part of the Adriatic Sea. It is situated near Dubrovnik in front of the Rijeka Dubrovačka ria. The area of the island is about 0.07 km^{2} (0.027 sq mi), the highest point is 24 m (79 ft) above sea level.

== History ==
The Daksa's Franciscan monastery was built in 1281.

=== Daksa massacre (1944) ===
The island was the site of the Daksa massacre by Yugoslav partisans entering Dubrovnik in late October 1944. The NDH mayor of Dubrovnik Niko Koprivica was among those executed, as well as Jeusit Petar Perica. In September 2009, authorities discovered the remains of six victims in the area. Soon after, the Daksa 1944/45 Association announced that 48 bodies had been discovered on the island. Association filled criminal charges for war crimes in 2009.

The president of the Croatian Helsinki Committee Ivo Banac called for an investigation into what exactly occurred during the massacre. Members of the Croatian Bishops' Conference visited the site in October 2009.

== See also ==
- Petar Perica
- Jakljan
