= François Tajan =

French auctioneer (1962–2020)

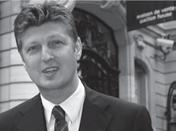
- Born: 27 June 1962; Évreux, France
- Died: 26 February 2020 (aged 57); Paris, France
- Occupation: Auctioneer

François Tajan (27 June 1962 – 26 February 2020) was a French auctioneer.

== Biography ==
The son of auctioneer Jacques Tajan, François obtained degrees in law and art history. He then earned his diploma as an auctioneer in 1997. After a stint in cinema, Tajan joined his father in the world of auctions. He was an associate auctioneer in 1998, and became President of Tajan in 2001. In 2005, he left Tajan and joined Artcurial Briest Le Fur Poulain Tajan auction house, which became Artcurial in 2015 with Tajan as co-president. On 1 November 2015, Tajan became deputy president.

Tajan set numerous sales records during his tenure as an auctioneer. On 8 February 2009, he managed to collect €222,000 for the nose of the SS France. He secured €311,594, 25 times the original amount, for the bar of the Hôtel de Crillon, which was designed by César Baldaccini. In June 2014, he organized a sale of Tintin collectibles, which totaled 5.3 million euros. On 30 April 2016, Tajan sold a copy of King Ottokar's Sceptre owned by Renaud for 1.046 million euros. On 22 November 2016, he sold a section of the Eiffel Tower staircase for 523,800 euros, even though its worth was estimated at a mere 30,000-40,000 euros. On 24 June 2017, Tajan managed to sell copies of Apostrophes, hosted by Bernard Pivot for €16,900.

François Tajan died on 26 February 2020 due to food poisoning.

=== Personal life ===
Tajan was a fan of rock music, having purchased several Rolling Stones albums starting at age 10. He was also a collector of modern art, particularly the works of painter Pierre Scholla.

He had three children. His son, Louis, was born from Tajan's first marriage, while Gabriel and Eloïse were from his second wife, Véronique.
