= Mišnjak (Šipan) =

Island in Dubrovnik-Neretva County, Croatia

- Interactive map of Mišnjak

Geography
- Location: Adriatic Sea
- Coordinates: 42°45′31″N 17°49′53″E
- Archipelago: Elaphiti Islands
- Area: 2.5 ha (6.2 acres)

Administration
- Croatia
- County: Dubrovnik-Neretva

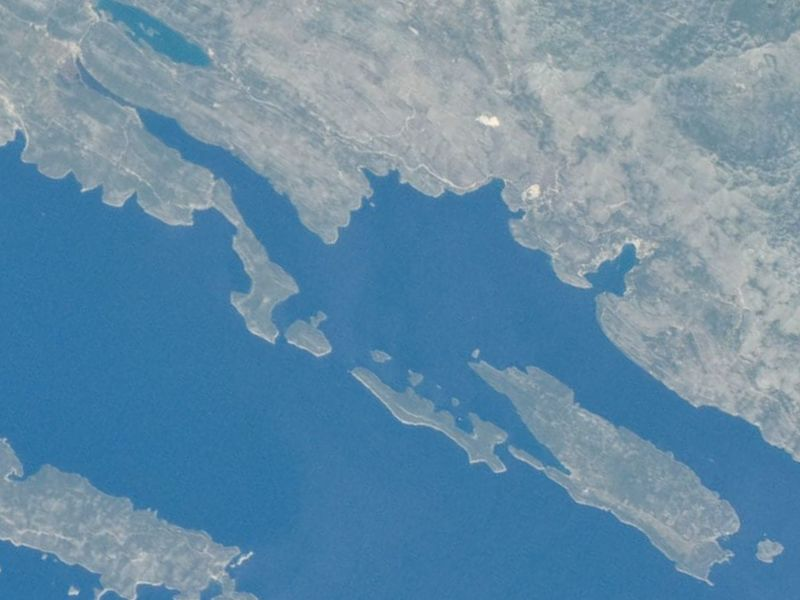
Aerial photographs of Pelješac and surrounding islands

Mišnjak is an uninhabited islet in Croatia, part of the Elaphiti Islands archipelago off the coast of southern Dalmatia, near Dubrovnik. Its area is 2.5 hectares (6.2 acres) and its coastline is 0.64 kilometres (0.40 mi) long.
