= Tajan (Jakljan) =

- Interactive map of Tajan

Geography
- Location: Adriatic Sea
- Coordinates: 42°45′32″N 17°47′47″E
- Archipelago: Elaphiti Islands
- Area: 0.111 km^{2} (0.043 sq mi)

Administration
- Croatia
- County: Dubrovnik-Neretva

Demographics
- Population: 0

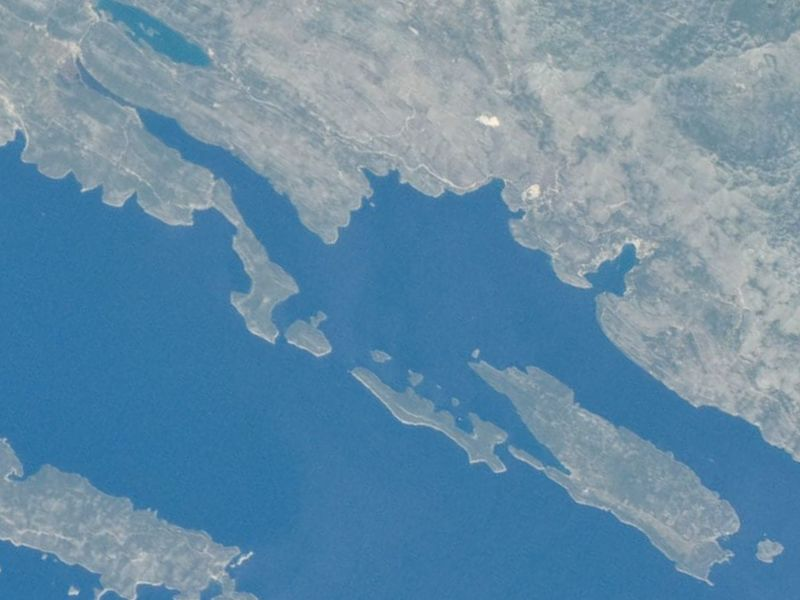

Tajan is an uninhabited islet in Croatia, part of the Elaphiti Islands archipelago off the coast of southern Dalmatia, near Dubrovnik. It is located near the island of Jakljan. Its area is 0.111 km^{2} and its coastline is 1.41 km long.
