= Niko Koprivica =

Mayor of Dubrovnik
- In office 13 October 1944 – 25 October 1944

Personal details
- Born: October 7, 1889 Cavtat, Austria-Hungary (modern-day Croatia)
- Died: October 25, 1944 (aged 55) Dubrovnik, Yugoslavia (modern-day Croatia)
- Party: Croatian Peasant Party
- Spouse: Ida Šuplika
- Children: Zlatko Koprivica, Dorothy Koprivica
- Occupation: Lawyer, Politician
- Awards: Order of St. Gregory the Great (1926)

Niko Koprivica (7 October 1889 – 25 October 1944) was a Croatian lawyer, civic leader, and politician. He served briefly as the mayor of Dubrovnik during World War II and was executed without trial during the Daksa executions carried out by Yugoslav Partisans in October 1944.

== Early life and education ==
Niko Koprivica was born on 7 October 1889 in Cavtat, a town in southern Dalmatia, Croatia, then part of Austria-Hungary. His father, Miho (Michele) Koprivica (1855–1936), originated from Gruda in the Konavle region and moved to Cavtat in 1881. His mother, Ana Borovinić, hailed from the nearby village of Čilipi. The Koprivica family, mostly farmers and laborers, had deep roots in the region.

Koprivica completed his primary education in Cavtat and attended the Classical Gymnasium in Dubrovnik. He pursued higher education at the Faculty of Law at the University of Zagreb, graduating with a law degree in 1915.

== Legal and civic career ==
After his studies, Koprivica served as a judge in Herzegovina and Bosnia, working in Mostar, Zenica, and Doboj between 1915 and 1922. Following the formation of the Kingdom of Serbs, Croats, and Slovenes (later Yugoslavia), he resigned from state judicial service, citing political tensions and the persecution of Croatian judges.

Returning to Dubrovnik, he established a private law practice and became a highly respected attorney. Koprivica was an active member of civic organizations, including the cultural society Brethren of the Croatian Dragon, where he held the honorary title of Dragon of Cavtat. In 1926, he was awarded the Order of St. Gregory the Great by Pope Pius XI for his civic contributions and service to the Catholic Church.

== Political activity and mayorship ==
During World War II, following the establishment of the Independent State of Croatia (NDH), Koprivica remained politically aligned with the Croatian Peasant Party, which had largely been marginalized during the war. Despite the shifting political landscape, he was appointed Mayor of Dubrovnik on 13 October 1944, just days before the city's liberation by Yugoslav Partisans.

== Death ==
After the entry of Yugoslav Partisans into Dubrovnik in October 1944, Koprivica was arrested and accused of collaboration with the NDH regime, despite his longstanding affiliation with the Croatian Peasant Party. He was executed without trial on 25 October 1944 during the Daksa executions, a mass execution of perceived political opponents carried out on the nearby island of Daksa.

== Burial and posthumous recognition ==
In 2007, following historical investigations, Koprivica's remains were located near Zaorsan Bay on the island of Šipan. He was reburied at Boninovo Cemetery in Dubrovnik on 10 October 2008 during a ceremony attended by clergy, civic leaders, and descendants.

== Personal life ==
Niko Koprivica married Ida Šuplika from Sisak, Croatia. They had two children:

- Zlatko Koprivica, who died during the postwar refugee crisis.
- Dorothy Koprivica, who married Dr. Luttenberger and later lived in Opatija.

== Legacy ==
Koprivica's life has come to symbolize the complex and tragic fates of civic leaders in Dalmatia during World War II. Recent historical research has emphasized his contributions to Dubrovnik's legal and cultural life, independent of the wartime regime's politics.

== See also ==
- Daksa executions
- History of Dubrovnik during World War II
- Croatian Peasant Party
