= Jakljan =

Island of Croatia

- Location within Croatia
- Interactive map of Jakljan

Geography
- Location: Adriatic Sea
- Coordinates: 42°44′28″N 17°49′06″E
- Archipelago: Elaphiti Islands
- Area: 3.4 km^{2} (1.3 sq mi)
- Highest elevation: 222 m (728 ft)

Administration
- Croatia
- County: Dubrovnik-Neretva County

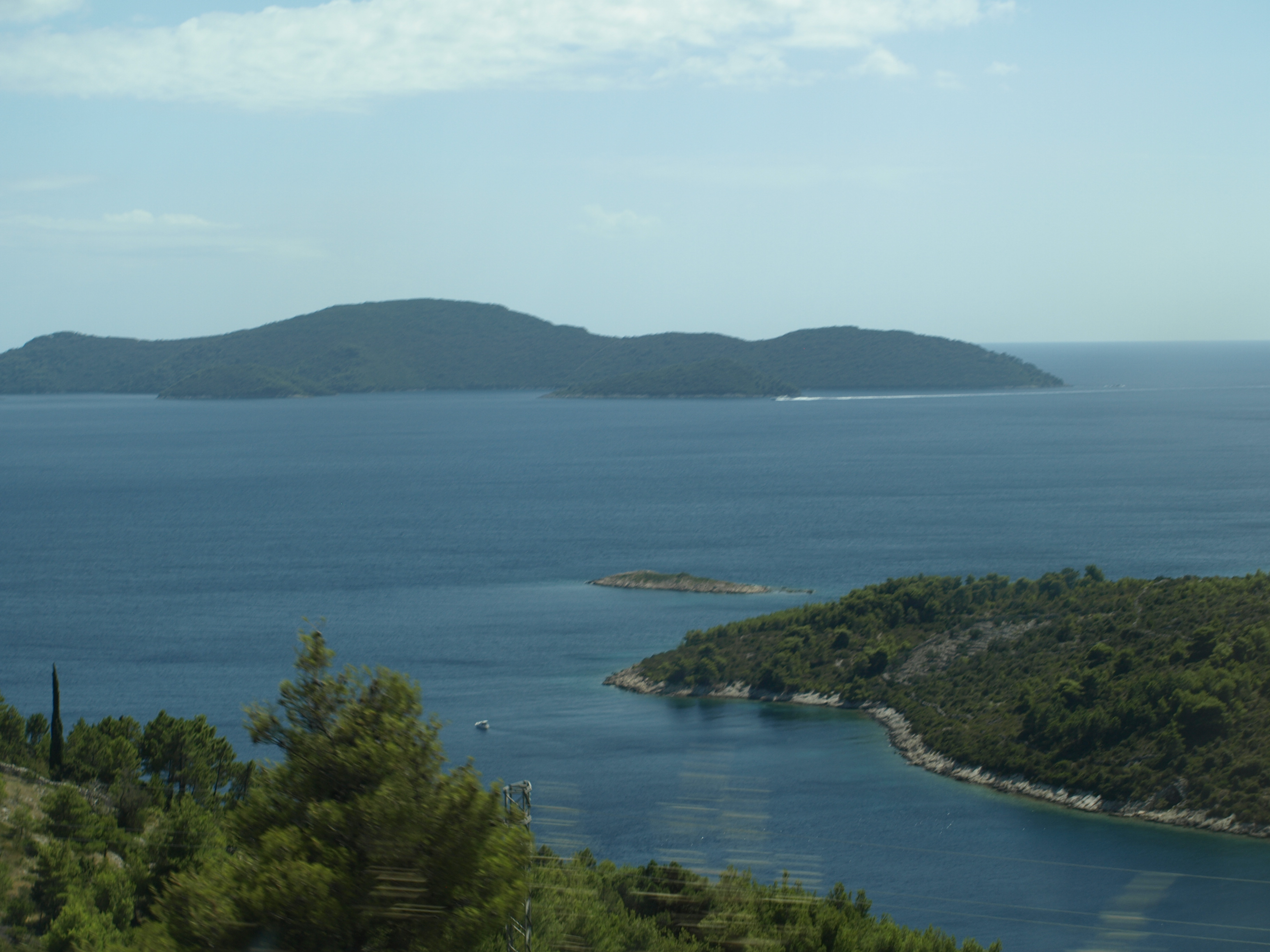
Jakljan

Jakljan is an uninhabited islet in Croatia, part of the Elaphiti Islands archipelago off the coast of southern Dalmatia. It is located northwest of Dubrovnik and west of the island of Šipan. Its area is 3.4 km^{2} and its coastline is 14.6 km long. A children's resort and recreational center is located on the island.

The island was the site of a mass execution of 204 German and Croatian prisoners of war by Yugoslav Partisans in May 1945. Discovery and exhumation of the site began in mid-February 2013. By 28 February the remains of 214 males had been recovered. The remains were buried in a joint grave at the Home Guard cemetery in Dubrovnik on 1 March 2013.

== See also ==
- Daksa

== Sources ==
- Jakljan at peljar.cvs.hr (in Croatian)
