= Szymon Golec =

Polish composer

- Born: 2002 (age 23–24); Kraków
- Citizenship: Polish
- Education: Academy of Music in Kraków
- Occupation: Composer
- Website: szymongolec.bandcamp.com

Szymon Golec (born 2002) is an electroacoustic composer, instrumentalist, experimental music producer, vocalist and Jewish activist.

== Biography ==
In 2018, he won two composition competitions in Poland. In 2024, he completed his bachelor's degree in composition at the Krzysztof Penderecki Academy of Music in Kraków, in the class of Marcel Chyrzyński. In the same year, he began his master's degree in composition at the Academy of Music in Kraków.

He has composed instrumental and electroacoustic music. He is interested in visual arts, multimedia, symbols, generativity, Jewish mysticism, psychology, and spirituality. He creates "intimate sound worlds". His interests include sound design, electroacoustic, acoustic, and improvised music.

In 2025, he received an honorable mention at the 8th International Krzysztof Penderecki Competition for Young Composers organized by the Polish Composers' Union – Kraków Branch, for his composition "Beyond the Veil of Shadows" for clarinet, cello, and piano. Also in 2025, he was obtained residency of the international festival of new music Ostrava Days. In May 2025, he performed with the SEx Ensemble at the 37th Krakow International Festival of Composers. In July 2025, the Cracow Guitar Quartet performed his piece "David's Harps" at Niepołomice Castle.

Szymon Golec has released two studio albums and one single with Elektramusic.

== Discography ==
=== Studio albums ===
- Bathyscaphe (2022)
- Symbols and Visions (2023)

=== Singles ===
- Shekhinah, for chamber ensemble and electronics (2024)
