= Daksa massacre =

Mass execution perpetrated by the Yugoslav Partisans

Daksa executions
- Part of World War II
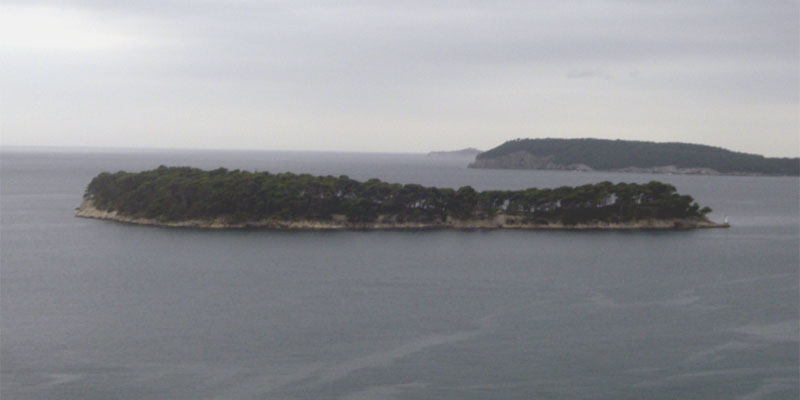
- Island of Daksa
- Location: 42°40′05″N 18°03′28″E; Daksa, Croatia
- Date: 24 October 1944- 25 October 1944
- Target: Alleged pro-Ustaše collaborationists
- Attack type: Mass shootings
- Deaths: 53 (according to various sources)
- Perpetrator: (Socialist Federal Republic of Yugoslavia) Yugoslav Partisans

The Daksa massacre, also called the Daksa executions, refers to the war crime summary execution of 53 men, accused of collaboration, by Yugoslav Partisans on 24–25 October 1944 during World War II on the Croatian island of Daksa, near Dubrovnik.

After the Partisans entered Dubrovnik on 18 October 1944, they arrested more than 300 citizens. 53 were executed on Daksa without trial. Exhumation and DNA analysis have confirmed the identities of 18 of these, while 35 remain unknown. The Partisans later published and distributed flyers through Dubrovnik with the words: "In the name of peoples of Yugoslavia" and "Judicial Council of the Court Martial of the Command of South Dalmatian region". The flyers contained the names of 35 people killed on that date.

On 19 June 2010, the remains of the executed men were re-interred. The victims included a Catholic priest, Father Petar Perica (who composed the song "Djevo Kraljice Hrvata"), and Niko Koprivica, Dubrovnik's mayor. No one was ever tried for the executions.

The list of people killed on Daksa

1. Tomislav Baća
2. Petar Barbir, typographer
3. Slavko Barbir, student
4. Boris Berković, journalist (Zagreb, 1920 - Daksa, 1944)
5. Marijan Blažić, prof. (St. Matthew, Kastav, March 25, 1897 - Daksa, October 25, 1944)
6. Ante Brešković, merchant (Nerežišća on Brač, January 1, 1912 - Daksa, October 25, 1944)
7. Baldo Crnjak, craftsman (Trnova 1901 - Daksa 1944)
8. don Mato Dobud (Luka Šipanska, 19 September 1882 - Daksa, 25 October 1944)
9. Milan Goszl, merchant (Ruma, 1884 - Daksa, 1944)
10. don Mato Kalafatović-Milić (Janjina, July 23, 1911 - Daksa, October 25, 1944)
11. dr. Niko Koprivica, mayor of Dubrovnik, lawyer and champion of the Croatian Peasant Party
12. don Đuro Krečak (Dubrovnik, April 23, 1883 - Daksa, October 25, 1944)
13. Ivo Knežević, farmer (Dubrovnik 1910 - Daksa, 1944)
14. Ivan Kubeš (Kubesch), clerk (Korčula, 1913 - Daksa, 1944)
15. Jure (Đuro) Matić, postman (Točionik, 1895 - Daksa, 1944)
16. Željko Milić, captain of a long voyage
17. Makso Milošević, prof., Director of the Dubrovnik Gymnasium, (Dobrota in the Bay of Kotor 1887 - Daksa 1944)
18. Antun Mostarcic, prof. (Imotski, 1903 - Daksa, 1944)
19. Ivan Nikić, clerk (Dubrovnik, 1923 - Daksa, 1944)
20. Niko Nunić, B.Sc. Lawyer, Secretary of the Municipality of Dubrovnik (Dubrovnik, 1903 - Daksa, 1944)
21. Nikola Obradović, farmer (Danube, 1903 - Daksa, 1944)
22. Ivo Peko, director of the Dubrovnik Roundabout and journalist (Dubrovnik 1903-Daksa 1944)
23. Petar Perica (Kotišina above Makarska, June 27, 1881 - Daksa, October 25, 1944)
24. Dr. Baldo Poković, lawyer (Dubrovnik, 1897- Daksa, 1944)
25. Mato Račević, school janitor (Vitaljina, 1905 - Daksa, 1944)
26. Vido Regjo (Grbavac, 1906 - Daksa 1944)
27. Don Josip Schmidt (Vukovar, March 1, 1914 - Daksa, October 25, 1944)
28. Nedjeljko Dinko Šarić, tax officer (Trstenik, 1905 - Daksa, 1944)
29. Ante Tasovac, police scout (Vela Luka, 1907 - Daksa, 1944)
30. Toma Tomasic, prof. (Baška Draga, 17 August 1881 - Daksa, 25 October 1944)
31. Martin Tomić (Dračevo, 1907 - Daksa, 1944)
32. Josip Tuta, student (Dubrovnik, 1924 - Daksa, 1944)
33. Frano Vojvodić, president of the mixed Croatian choir Gundulić in Dubrovnik, (Brgat, 1897 - Daksa, 1944)
34. Marijan Vokić, driver (Sovići, Drinovci, 1915 - Daksa, 1944)
35. Frano Žiška, retired officer (1897 - 1944)
36. Dr. Ivo Karlović, Mayor of Dubrovnik (1893 - 1944)
