= Goleč =

Islet in Croatia

- Interactive map of Goleč

Geography
- Location: Adriatic Sea
- Coordinates: 42°45′0.2″N 17°49′11″E
- Archipelago: Elaphiti Islands
- Area: 0.1 km^{2} (0.039 sq mi)

Administration
- Croatia
- County: Dubrovnik-Neretva County

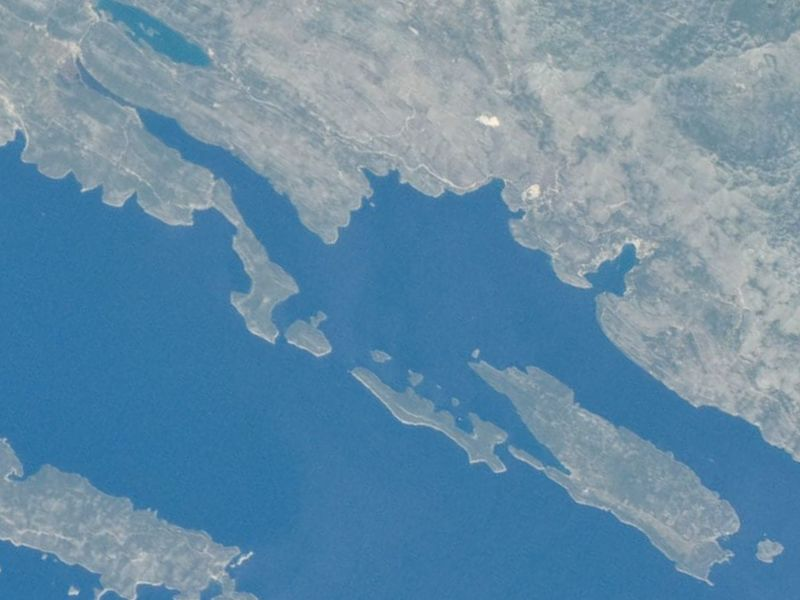
Aerial photographs of Pelješac and surrounding islands

Goleč (pronounced [ɡǒletʃ]) is an uninhabited islet in Croatia, part of the Elaphiti Islands archipelago off the coast of southern Dalmatia, near Dubrovnik. The total area of the island is 0.1 km^{2} (0.039 sq mi).
