= Koločep =

Island in Croatia

Coordinates: 42°40′35″N 18°0′24″E

Kalamota
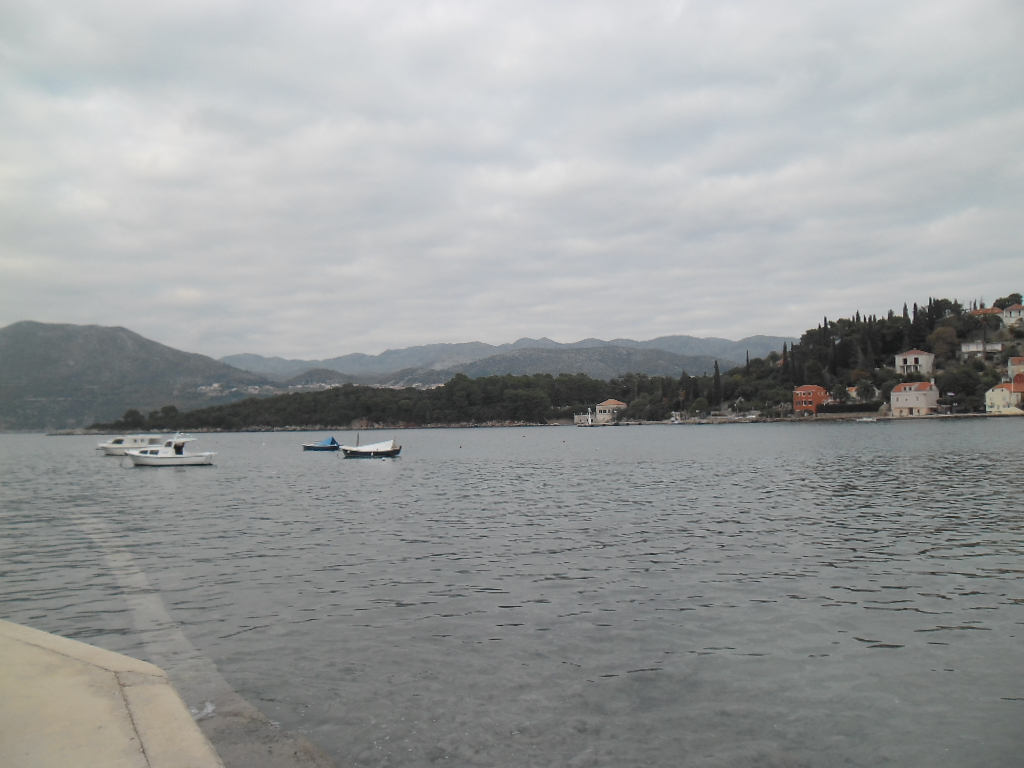

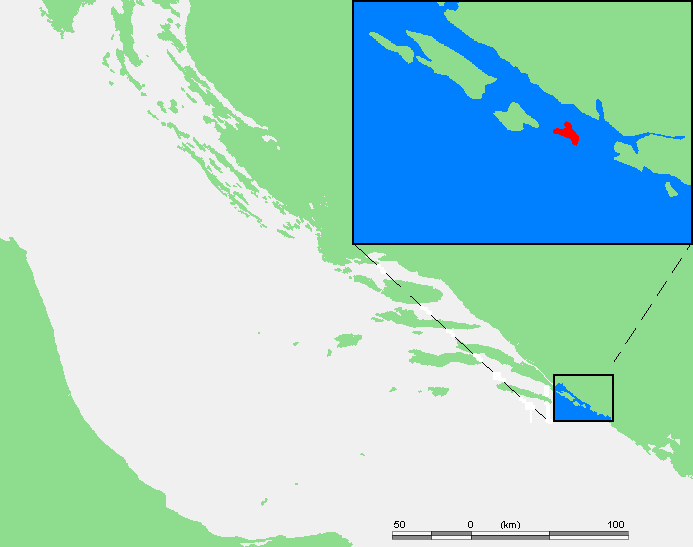

- Location within Croatia

Geography
- Location: Adriatic Sea
- Archipelago: Elaphiti Islands
- Area: 2.44 km^{2} (0.94 sq mi)
- Coastline: 12.9 km (8.02 mi)
- Highest elevation: 125 m (410 ft)
- Highest point: Križ

Administration
- Croatia
- County: Dubrovnik-Neretva County

Demographics
- Population: 231 (2021)
- Pop. density: 94.67/km^{2} (245.19/sq mi)

Koločep (pronounced [kɔ̂lɔtʃɛp]; locally known as Kalamota (pronounced [kalǎːmɔta]) from Italian: Calamotta) is the southernmost inhabited island in Croatia and one of the three inhabited Elaphiti Islands situated near the city of Dubrovnik. Koločep has an area of 2.44 square kilometres (0.94 square miles). According to the 2021 census, its population was 231. In the 2011 census, the population of the island was 163.

== Location and access ==
The island of Koločep lies at a distance of 1 kilometre (0.6 miles) from the closest point on the mainland and about the same distance from the peninsula of Lapad, further east towards the city of Dubrovnik itself. The port of Dubrovnik (Gruž) is situated at the base of a bay on the other side of Lapad, requiring a 5 kilometres (3 miles) journey by boat to the island. The island can be reached by regular ferry service Jadrolinija – the "Postira" and "Premuda" services connect the Elaphiti Islands several times throughout the day. It is a 20-minute boat ride from one port to the other (Dubrovnik–Koločep) by ferry, or 10 minutes by water taxi.

The island lent its name to Koločepski Channel - a part of the Adriatic Sea between the Olipa and Koločep islands and the mainland opposite of them.

== Population and transportation ==
There are two settlements on the island called Gornje Čelo and Donje Čelo. Both are situated in their respective coves and connected with a 1.5-kilometre (0.9-mile) paved road. Koločep is car free but many paths and walkways criss-cross the island.

Historical population
1857	1910	1921	1948	1991	2011	2021
405	237	218	251	148	163	231

== Climate and vegetation ==
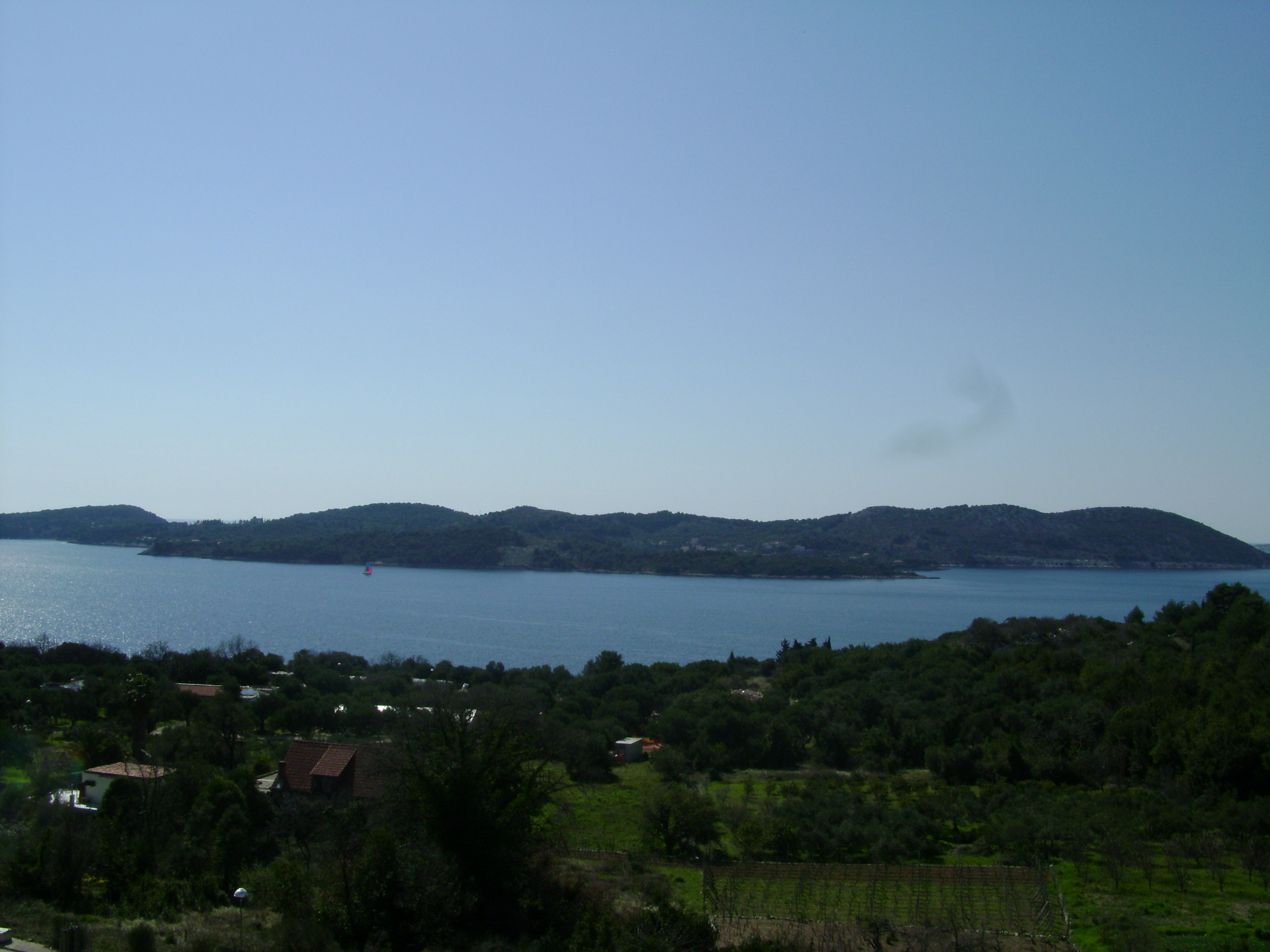
Island of Koločep

Koločep has an average of 215 sunny days a year. Its climate is of a moderate Mediterranean type, and due to the isle's indented coastline and small area, the predominant climatic features throughout the island are influenced by the Adriatic. The sea moderates the air temperature considerably keeping the average monthly daytime highs above 10 °C (50 °F) in the winter time and below 27 °C (81 °F) in the summer.

Clear waters surrounding the island range from deep blue to turquoise aqua. The coastline has with a number of hidden coves: the Blue Cave can be accessed swimming from one such cove on the south side of the island. An area off shore where lobsters abound is another one of Koločep's features.

The islands flora includes stands of tall pine and olive groves.

== History ==
Earliest known traces of human habitation date to the times of Ancient Greece. In the times of the Republic of Ragusa, Koločep was an important shipbuilding site. Two members of Christopher Columbus’ crew on the Santa Maria were sailors from the island. Archaeological remnants of ancient European conquerors have been found on the island: from the ancient times of Greece and Rome to the Napoleonic times. The island has seven pre-Romanesque churches dating back to the times of Croatian kings, from the 9th to the 11th century.

== Dubrovnik Čilipi approach ==
A non-directional beacon used for landing at Dubrovnik Čilipi airport is located on Koločep Island.

== Bibliography ==
- Glamuzina, Martin; Glamuzina, Nikola (1999). "Suvremena geografska problematika otoka Lopuda i Koločepa" [Recent Geographical Problematics of the Lopud and Koločep Islands] (PDF). Geoadria (in Croatian). 4 (1): 89–100. doi:10.15291/geoadria.152.
- Magaš, Damir; Faričić, Josip; Surić, Maša (2001). "Elafitsko otočje - fizičko-geografska obilježja u funkciji društveno-gospodarskog razvitka" [Elaphites Islands – Physical-Geographical Characteristics in Function of Socio-Economical Development] (PDF). Geoadria (in Croatian). 6 (1): 31–55. doi:10.15291/geoadria.161.
