= Battle of Vukov Klanac =

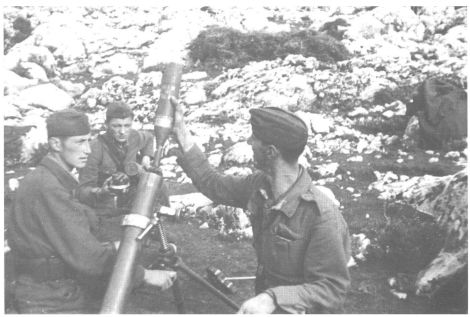
- Partisans operating a mortar in Vukov Klanac
Date	15–23 October 1944
Location	Between Ston and Metković, Independent State of Croatia
Result	Partisan victory

Belligerents
Yugoslav Partisans	NDH (Nazi Germany) Germany

Commanders and leaders
Božo Božović; Vlado Šegrt	(Nazi Germany) Georg Reinicke

Units involved
(Yugoslav Partisans) 8th Corps: (Socialist Republic of Croatia) 26th Division; 1st Brigade; 11th Brigade; (Socialist Republic of Bosnia and Herzegovina) 29th Division (briefly)	(Nazi Germany) 369th Division: 369th Regiment; 370th Regiment; (Independent State of Croatia) 9th Brigade

Strength
3,000	(Nazi Germany) 8,000 (Independent State of Croatia) 720 militia

Casualties and losses
56 dead 260 wounded	2,000 dead (Note: Yugoslav sources from the 26th Division); 1,070 captured

The Battle of Vukov Klanac was a 7-day fight between Wehrmacht and Yugoslav Partisan forces in central Dalmatia. The battle occurred between 15 and 23 October 1944. It occurred in the region between Metković and Ston as Wehrmacht forces retreated from the nearby cities of Dubrovnik and Ston. It resulted in the 369th Devil's Division losing most of its equipment and a large fraction of its manpower to Partisan forces.

== Prelude ==
The grounds of the battle took place around Vukov Klanac (lit. 'Wolf's Gorge'), a toponym between the villages of Badžula and Neum, south of the Lower Neretva Valley.

It was fought between the majority of the Wehrmacht 369th "Devil's Division" and elements of the 8th Dalmatian Shock Corps, mainly the 1st and 11th Brigades of the 26th Division.

Prior to the battle the 369th was withdrawing from Dubrovnik following significant land gains from Dalmatian partisans. The Supreme Staff ordered the 26th Division to liberate Pelješac and to prevent the 369th division from retreating to Metković on the Neretva River. On 13 October, at the 26th Division's headquarters post in Janjina, Colonel Božo Božović, with his commissar Dušan Korač and chief of staff Ante Biočić met with the commanders of the 1st and 11th Brigades to form a plan to liberate Ston and cut off the Dubrovnik-Metković road.

== Battle ==
The 1st Brigade had to cross the Bay of Mali Ston and land near Neum, where it would infiltrate the Vukov Klanac area, cut off the Dubrovnik-Metković road, and prevent enemy counterattacks from Metković. The 11th Brigade was ordered to liberate Ston and then to assist the 1st Brigade in cutting off and defeating the Wehrmacht and Ustaše forces in withdrawing from Dubrovnik.

=== Neum ===
Before Ston could be taken, there were multiple tactically prominent locations that the Partisans needed to take. The 1st Brigade was divided into four battalions, with three crossing the Bay of Mali Ston and the fourth being held in reserve. The first and third landed near the village of Klek, while the second landed across the channel on the Klek Peninsula. The two battalions that landed near the village of Klek engaged the overstretched third battalion of the German 370th Regiment and quickly took control over surrounding villages along the coast. The battalion on the Klek peninsula advanced east towards the Neum-Ston road and took a crossroads about a kilometer south of Neum.

The following morning of 16 October, the German garrison in Neum was ordered to withdraw to the towns of Duži, Topola, and Ošlje. With the liquidation of the defense at Neum, elements of the 1st Brigade quickly occupied the important harbor of the town. From there, the third battalion was ordered to take the German stronghold of Kuti and deny the road to Metković. By the end of the day, a large swath of coast stretching from Neum to Klek and Slivno Ravno was under Partisan control, and the Dubrovnik-Metković road link was severed.

=== Entry into Vukov Klanac ===
The 1st Brigade was then tasked with breaking into the area of Vukov Klanac and taking the peak of Oštrikovac. Taking the mountain was important because the peak overlooked the crossroads of the road from Dubrovnik and the road from Ston. Over the day of 17 October, the 1st Brigade went on the attack and made significant gains across the Vukov Klanac area. The first battalion took Duži and was cycled into reserve, but not before it could sever the connection between Hutovo and Duži, trapping yet more German garrisons. Just north of Hutovo, the 13th Brigade, part of the 29th Herzegovinian Division, held position in Popovo Polje and was yet to make contact with the command of the 26th Division. By the end of the day of 17 October, the 2nd and 4th battalions had occupied Topolo and Ošlje, within striking distance of Oštrikovac. During this time the 3rd battalion broke the German garrison at Kuti and took over prepared German demolition points. The German reaction out of Metković was harsh. The Germans attacked the Partisans around the village of Kuti three times following the Partisans capturing the village. The 1st Brigade now held the Dubrovnik-Metković road from the outskirts of Metković all the way to Oštrikovac.

=== Ston ===
The 11th Brigade's attack on the town of Ston was supported by a British long-range artillery unit on Mljet. On 18 October, following the gains made by the 1st Brigade, the 11th Brigade commenced its attack on Ston. Prior to the 18 October the brigade had made minor attacks on bunkers and strongpoints around Ston but had failed to produce any major results. The Germans in the meantime had been reinforced by a company of quisling Italian fascists. On the 18th, however, following a concentrated attack from the 11th Brigade the Italians and Germans were forced to retreat from Mali Ston into Ston proper. Following the capture of Mali Ston, the partisans moved into an attack on the city of Ston, where resistance was stronger, helped by the intact medieval fortifications in Ston. German strongpoints in the forts of Kaštio and Korona were surrounded and held out for a few hours before Partisans overran the fortifications. By the evening of 18 October, Ston was completely under Partisan control. The remaining German forces retreated past Rudine and Doli to reinforce Oštrikovac, which was being attacked by Partisans in the surrounding shrubland. 258 Germans and Italians surrendered to the Partisans at Ston.

=== Oštrikovac ===
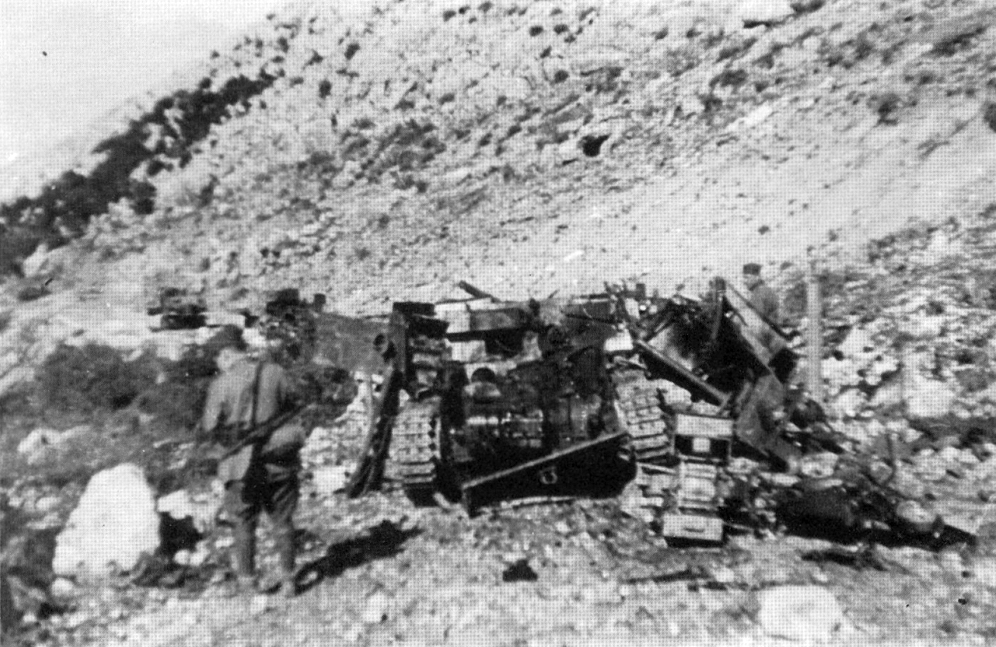
Yugoslav Partisans standing beside a destroyed German tank at Vukov Klanac, October 1944

As the 11th Brigade pressed the Germans at Ston, the Partisans in the area around Oštrikovac attacked the German stronghold on the mountain to prevent a successful German withdrawal from Ston. The 2nd and 4th battalions of the 1st Brigade attacked the stronghold around the same time the 11th Brigade attacked Ston. The German defenders had been reinforced by troops withdrawing from Dubrovnik. The attack continued inconclusively throughout the day of 18 October, with no significant gains made by the Partisans, even when the Partisans deployed the 1st Battalion to reinforce the attackers. The command of the 1st Brigade cancelled the attack that night to reorganize.

The next morning the attack resumed. At this same time, the German presence in the Vukov Klanac area was reorganized into Army Group "Becker", around 4,000 strong. A reinforced garrison at Metković began to move towards Partisan-occupied demolition points North of Vukov Klanac. Learning of an armored German advance from Metković, the Partisans used the demolition points to turn back the German advance. The command of the 26th Division, expecting a counterattack from the Germans at Oštrikovac as well, ordered the 1st Brigade to withdraw to the flanks of the Oštrikovac-Vukov Klanac road and prepared to ambush any advancing German forces. At the same time the 11th Brigade positioned along the Metković-Dubrovnik road to ambush the retreating column from Metković that had been stopped earlier that day.

The command of the 26th Division, worried about the uncertainty of the situation in Vukov Klanac and eager to secure its gains (Neum and Ston) earlier that week, had actually ordered the 1st Brigade to withdraw back to Pelješac and the 11th to Neum. However, conditions of heavy combat prevented either Brigade from being able to withdraw. The command of the entire 8th Dalmatian Corps shared the same concerns as the command of the 26th Division and ordered the 1st and 11th to withdraw from its situation by 22 October to be redeployed in Split and Brač.

=== Vukov Klanac ===
The order to withdraw came in a difficult situation for the brigades as they were tied down in brutal engagements with Army Group Becker, which was attempting to break through to Metković. This meant that neither brigade was able to withdraw at the time. On 20 October following the instructions of the 8th Corps, the command of the 26th Division sent a request to the 29th Division in Dubrovnik asking that Herzegovinian brigades replace the exhausted 1st and 11th brigades. This exchange was unable to occur as the headquarters of the 29th Division was too far to redeploy in time. Ante Biočić, Chief of Staff for the 26th division, disobeyed orders and refused to compel the division to retreat from its positions. The 11th Brigade went ahead with the direct orders of the 8th Corps and retreated to Mali Ston anyway, without Biočić's knowledge or permission.

With the absence of the 11th Brigade, the Northern flank of the Partisan salient around Vukov Klanac was left overstretched, only manned by the Brigade's 4th battalion. In the early morning of 21 October both Army Group Becker and the German garrison in Metković attacked the 1st Brigade. After an intense encounter with the garrison from Metković, the 4th battalion was able to temporarily halt its advance. However, the commander of the 1st Brigade, Bogdan Stupar, wanted to minimize the risk of the 4th battalion being badly damaged and ordered it out of the Metković area, instead having it test the German defenses at Opuzen. Throughout the rest of the day the other three battalions in the 1st Brigade battered the advancing column of Army Group Becker along the road to Vukov Klanac. By the end of the day the Metković force and Becker had met at Vukov Klanac, where the road had been demolished by Partisans. With the vehicles of Army Group Becker unable to cross the road, the force made the fatal decision to hold at Vukov Klanac.

The commander of Army Group Becker could have in theory continued towards Metković without his heavy equipment, but he was convinced that it was not worth losing so much armor and motorized war materiel. So it was that over the night of 21/22 October the entire force of Becker was left completely exposed to the war-seasoned Partisans' guerrilla tactics and suffered heavy casualties. Wounded had to be carried by stretcher across the long, exposed stretch of destroyed road to be evacuated to Metković. Engineers arrived the next day, 22 October, and the commander of the German force was told it would take a minimum of two weeks to repair the road. The force of Army Group Becker, now surrounded, held out for another night, under constant attack from Partisans of the 1st Brigade. At dawn on 23 October, Army Group Becker capitulated. Only a quarter of the German force managed to escape back to Metković. At the scene of the battle remained all German machinery and equipment, destroyed or damaged.

== Aftermath ==
On 23 October, Chief of Staff of the 26th Division, Ante Biočic reported to the Division Headquarters: "Bitter battles were fought with the enemy who sought to break through from Oštrikovac to Metković. Even the smallest remnants would probably have been destroyed had the 11th Brigade not been pulled out for a new task during the battle." The total losses of the enemy in the area of Ston-Vukov Klanac, according to the report of the 26th Division Headquarters of 17 November 1944, delivered to the 8th Corps Headquarters, amounted to 2,000 dead and 1,070 captured German soldiers and officers. 12 tanks and 20 trucks were destroyed. 211 motor vehicles were seized, one intact tank, 60 various cannons, 289 horses and various other equipment was taken. The 1st and 11th Dalmatian Brigade units had 56 dead and about 260 wounded.

== Footnotes ==
=== Books ===
- Anić, Nikola (2004). Povijest Osmog korpusa narodnooslobodilačke vojske Hrvatske 1943-1945 [History of the Eighth Corps of the People's Liberation Army of Croatia 1943-1945] (in Croatian).
- Mitcham, Samuel W. (2007). German Order of Battle: Volume Two. Stackpole Books. ISBN 978-0-8117-3416-5.
