= Mravnica =

Mravnica may refer to:

- Mravnica, Dubrovnik-Neretva County, a village in Dubrovačko Primorje
- Mravnica, Šibenik-Knin County, a village near Šibenik

== See also ==
- Mravince
