= Točionik =

Točionik may refer to:

- Točionik, Sokolac, a village in Bosnia and Herzegovina
- Točionik, Croatia, a village in Dubrovačko primorje
