= Lisac =

Lisac is a South Slavic surname meaning 'fox'. Notable people with the surname include:

- Gelu Lisac (born 1967), Romanian water polo player
- Josip Lisac (born 1950), Croatian linguist and dialectologist
- Josipa Lisac (born 1950), Croatian singer

Other uses:

- Lisac, Croatia, a village in Dubrovnik-Neretva County
