= Banići =

- Village
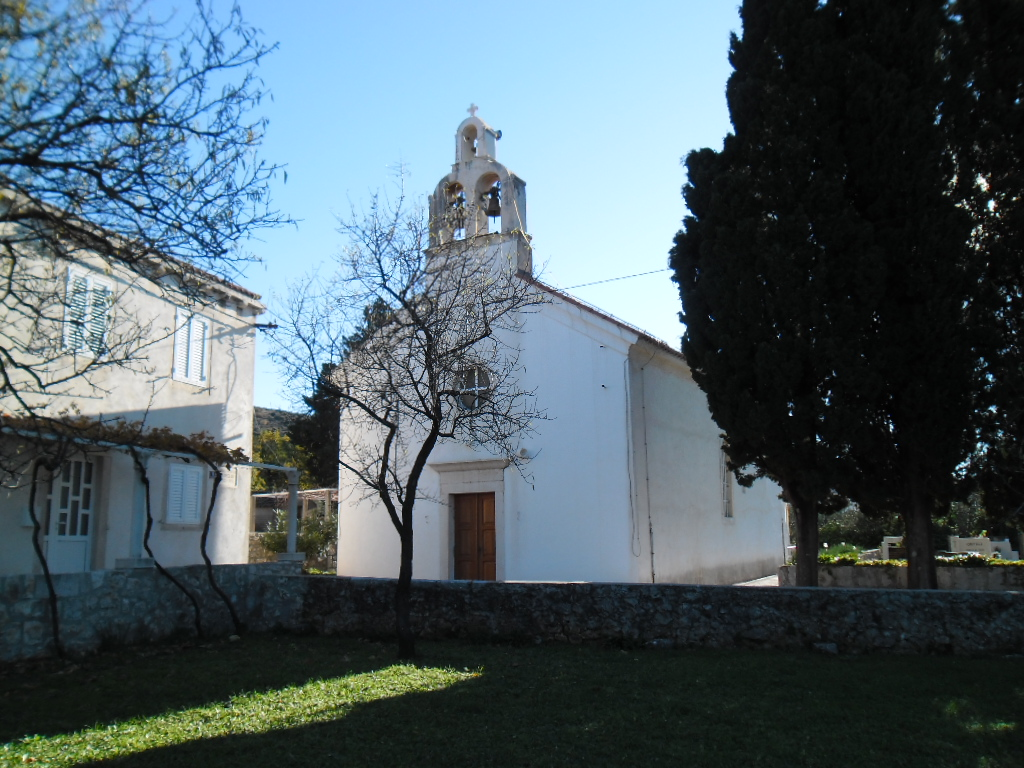
- St. Mary Magdalene Church

- Location within Croatia
- Coordinates: 42°47′54″N 17°51′27″E
- Country: Croatia
- County: Dubrovnik-Neretva County
- Municipality: Dubrovačko Primorje

Area
  - Total: 1.1 sq mi (2.9 km^{2})

Population (2021)
  - Total: 124
  - Density: 110/sq mi (43/km^{2})
- Time zone: UTC+1 (CET)
  - Summer (DST): UTC+2 (CEST)
- Postal code: 20232 Slano

Banići is a village in Croatia. It is located near Slano in the Dubrovačko Primorje municipality within the Dubrovnik-Neretva County in the south of the country. The village has a church dedicated to Mary Magdalene.

== Demographics ==
According to the 2021 census, its population was 124. According to the 2001 Croatian census, it had 143 inhabitants.

== Gallery ==
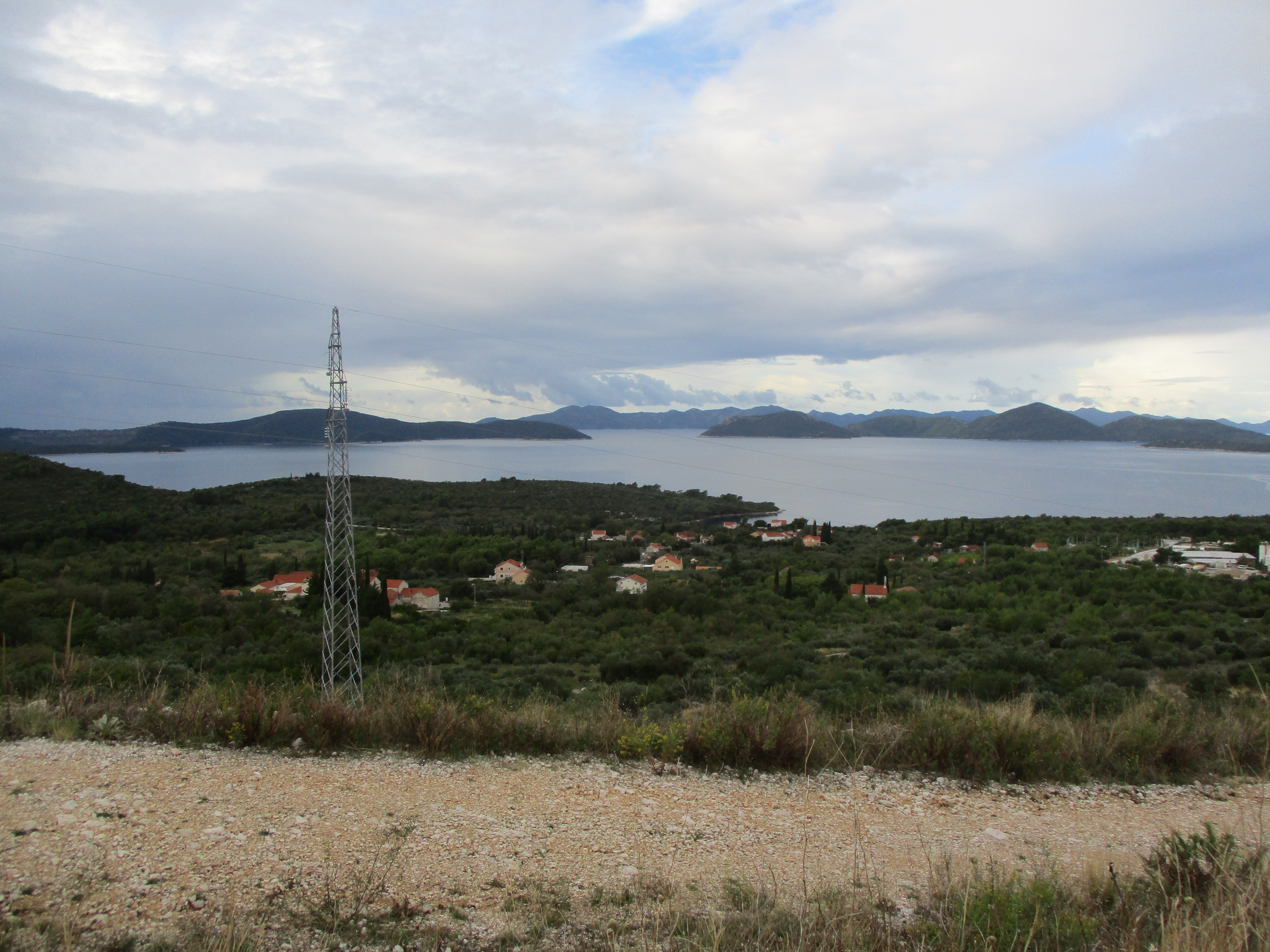
Banići

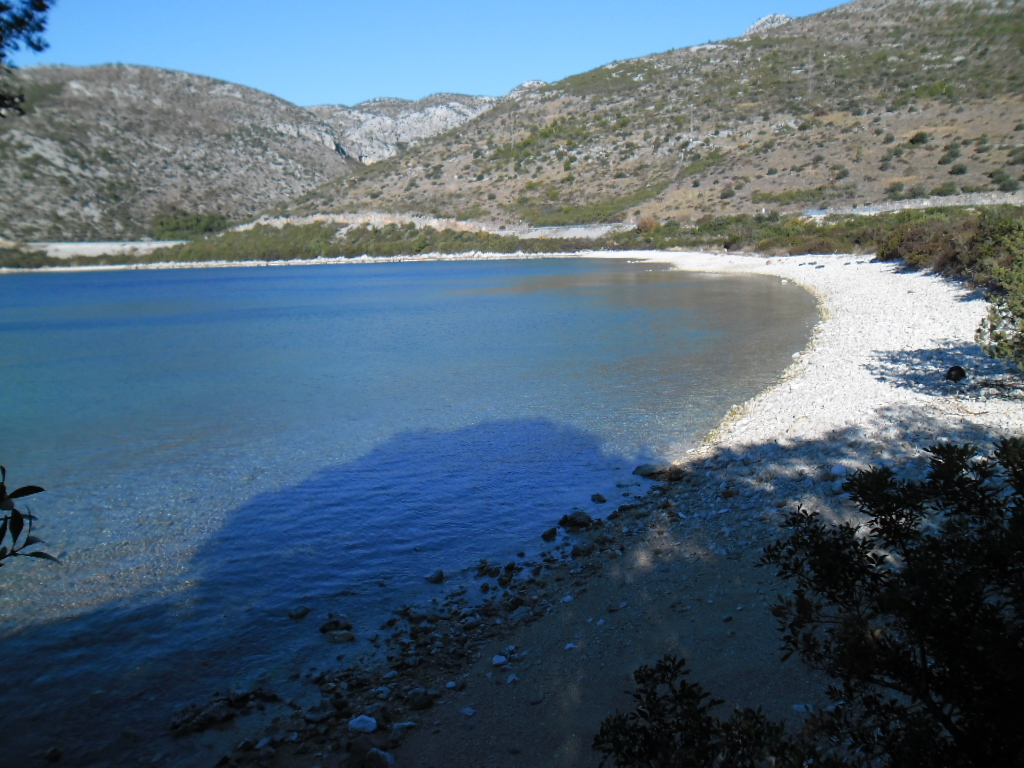
Budima Beach

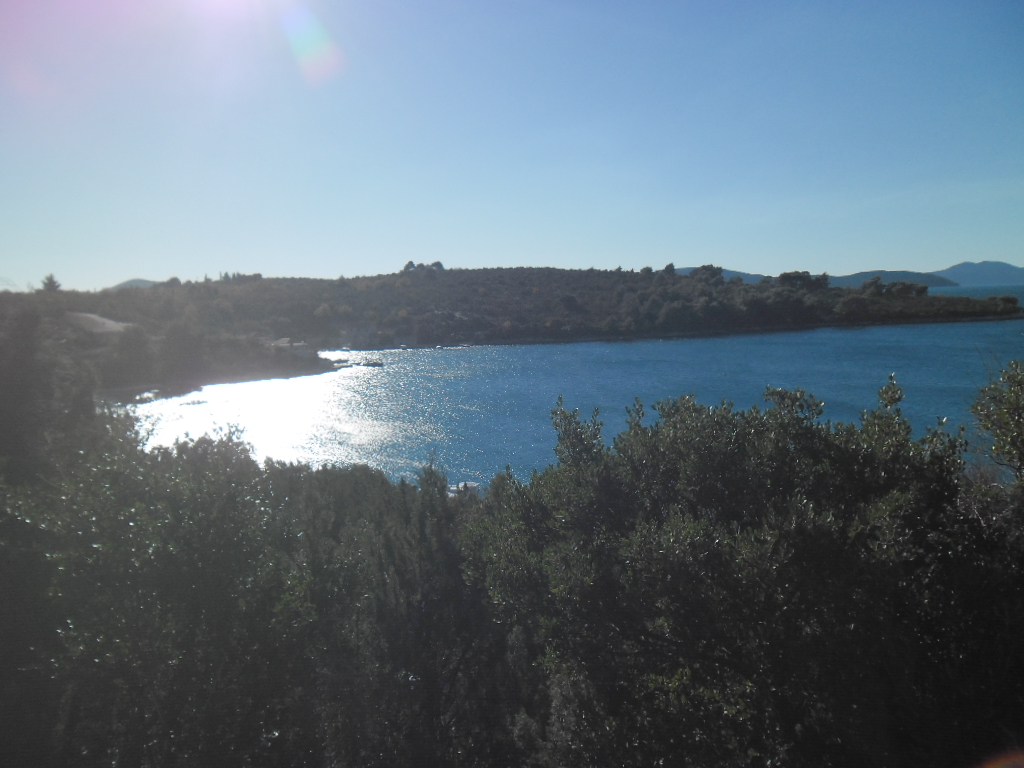
Janska inlet

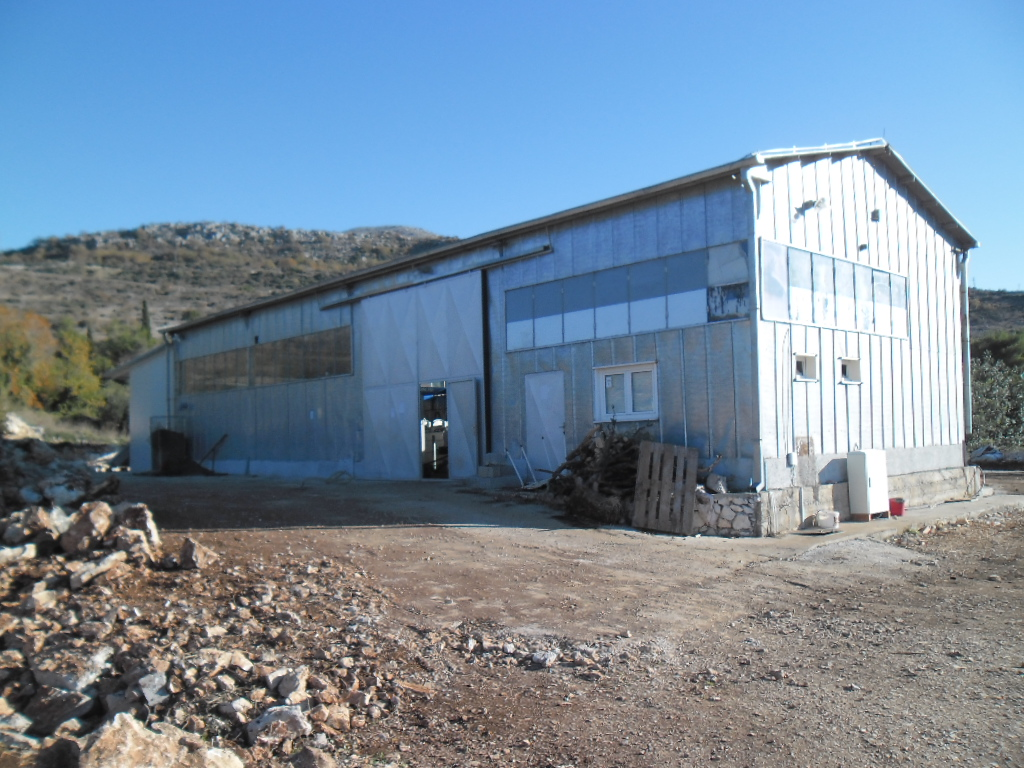
Banići mills

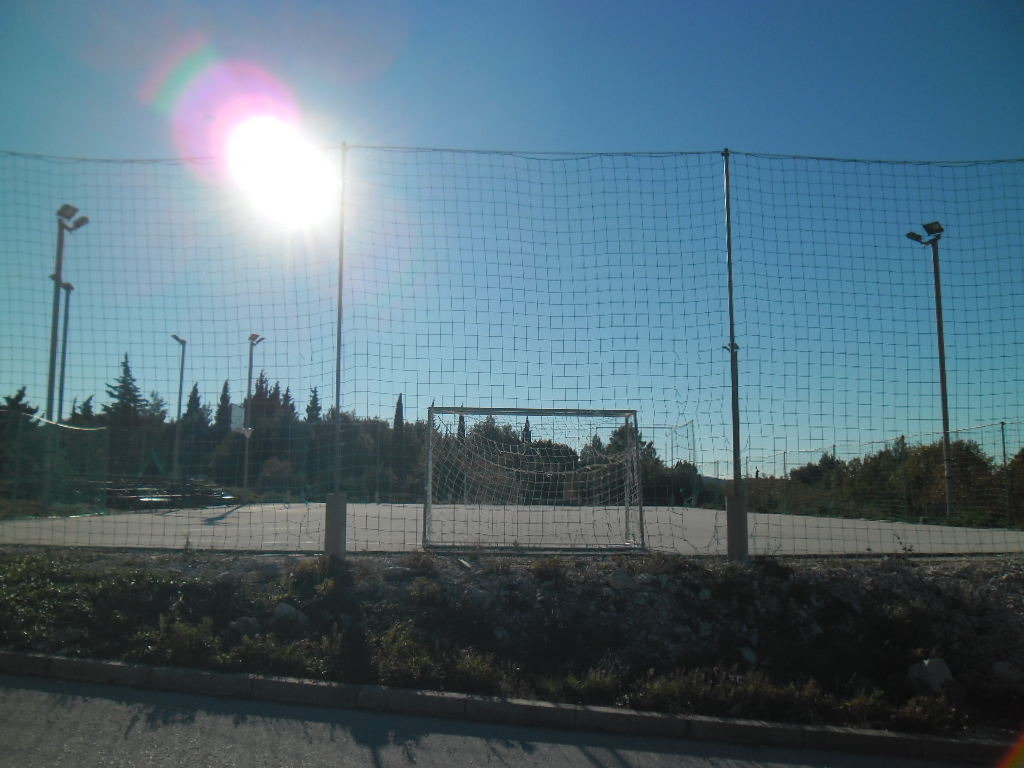
Playground in Banići

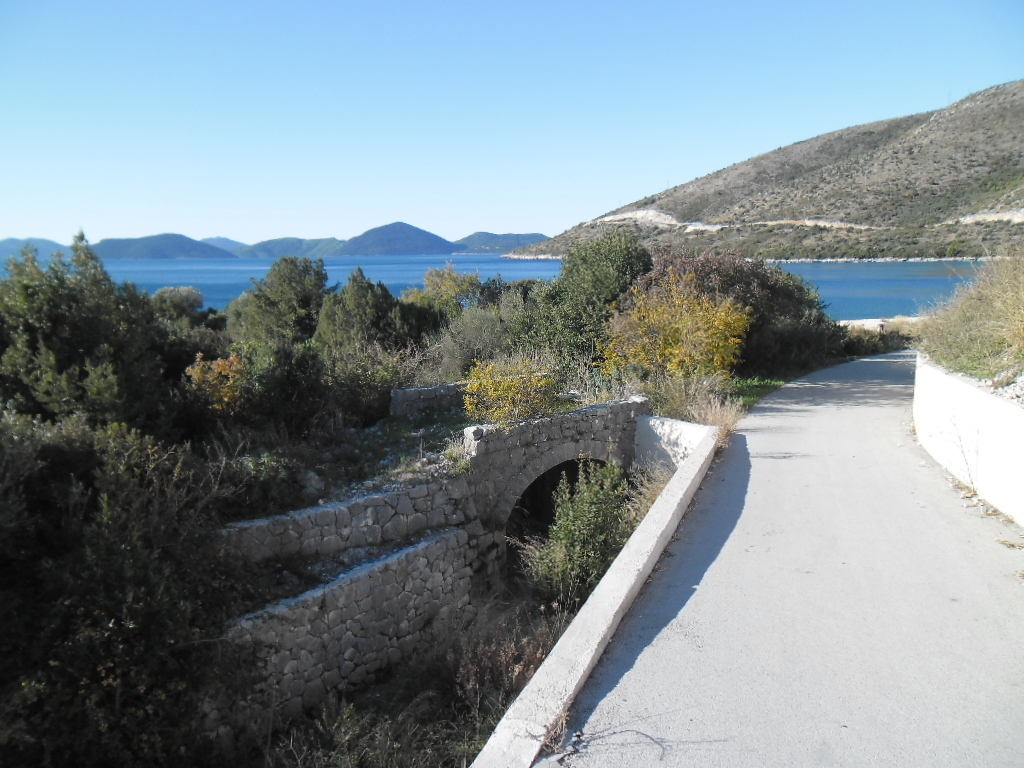
Bridge in Budima
