= Čepikuće =

Village in Dubrovnik-Neretva County, Croatia

- Village
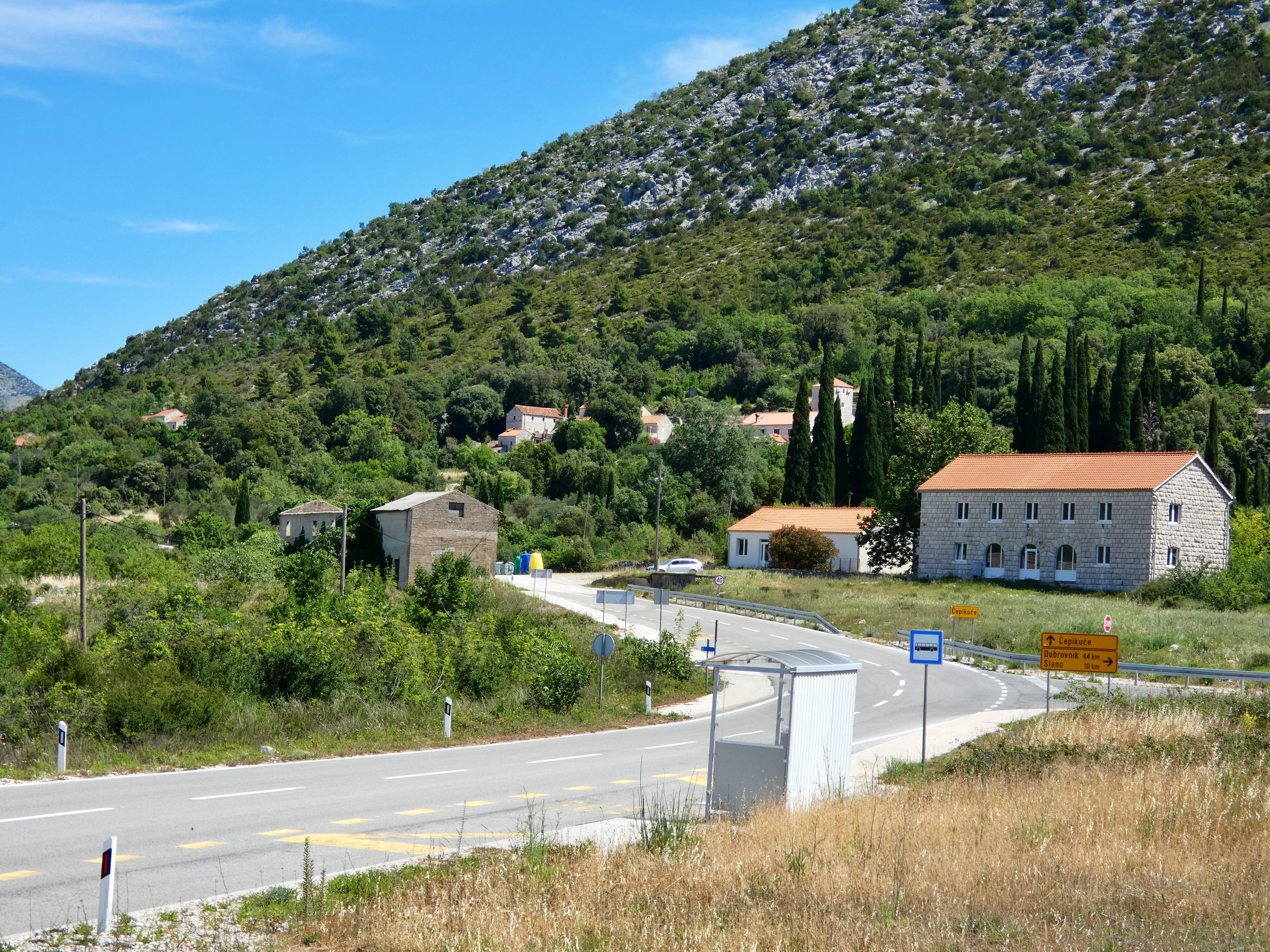
- Interactive map of Čepikuće
- Location within Croatia
- Coordinates: 42.8573607°N 17.8219873°E
- Country: Croatia
- County: Dubrovnik-Neretva County
- Municipality: Dubrovačko Primorje

Area
  - Total: 3.2 sq mi (8.2 km^{2})

Population (2021)
  - Total: 35
  - Density: 11/sq mi (4.3/km^{2})
- Time zone: UTC+1 (CET)
  - Summer (DST): UTC+2 (CEST)

Čepikuće is a small village in Dubrovnik-Neretva County, Croatia.

== Geography ==
Čepikuće is located by a state road that goes from Slano towards Bosnia and Herzegovina.

== Demographics ==
According to the 2021 census, its population was 35.
