= Trnova, Croatia =

Trnova
- Village
- Location within Croatia
- Coordinates: 42.8172671°N 17.8566279°E
- Country: Croatia
- County: Dubrovnik-Neretva County
- Municipality: Dubrovačko Primorje

Area
  - Total: 2.6 sq mi (6.7 km^{2})

Population (2021)
  - Total: 27
  - Density: 10/sq mi (4.0/km^{2})
- Time zone: UTC+1 (CET)
  - Summer (DST): UTC+2 (CEST)

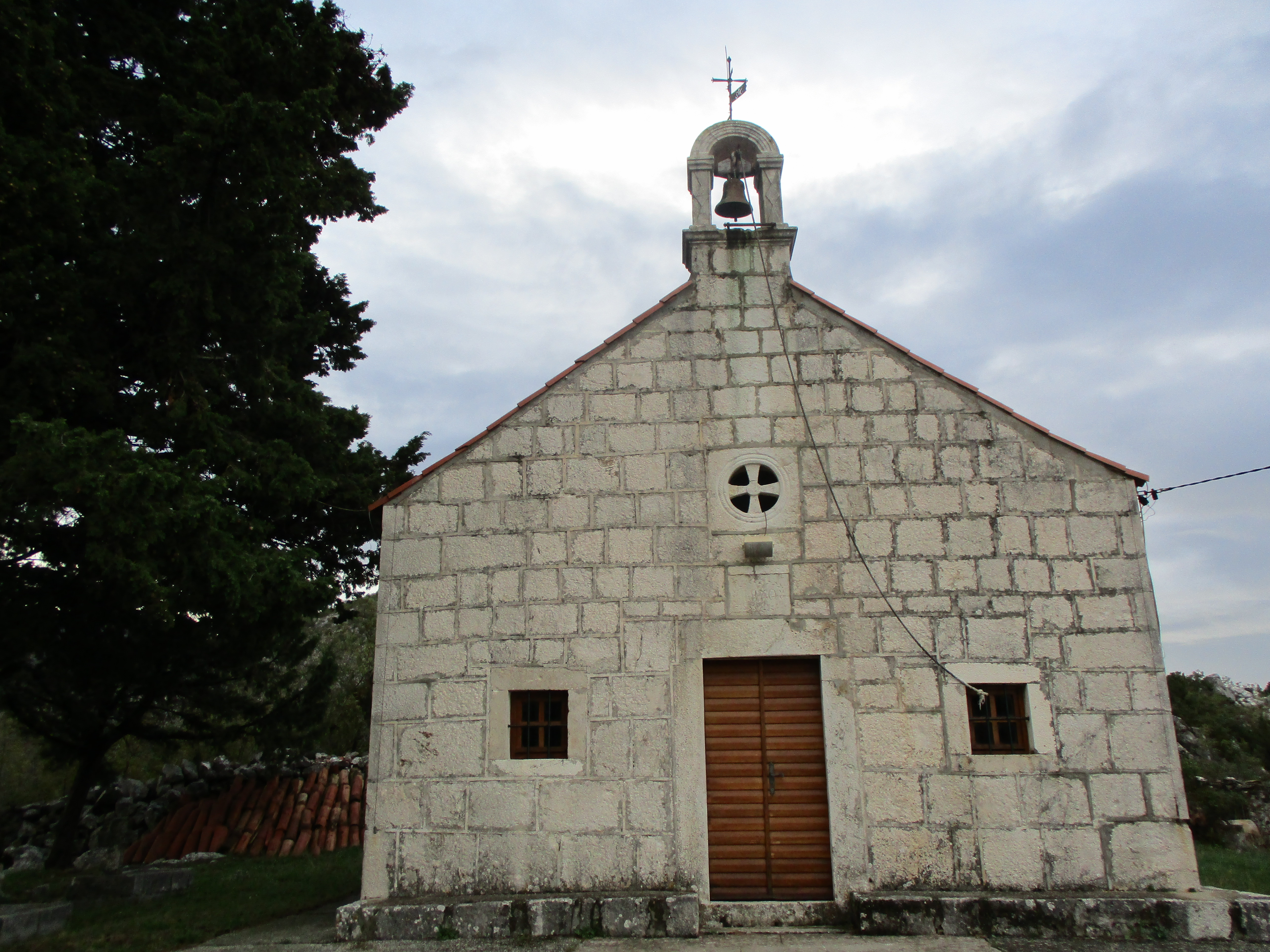
Church in Trnova

Trnova is a village in Croatia.

== Demographics ==
According to the 2021 census, its population was 27.
