= Štedrica =

- Village
- Location within Croatia
- Coordinates: 42.8886482°N 17.6618394°E
- Country: Croatia
- County: Dubrovnik-Neretva County
- Municipality: Dubrovačko Primorje

Area
  - Total: 3.7 sq mi (9.7 km^{2})

Population (2021)
  - Total: 55
  - Density: 15/sq mi (5.7/km^{2})
- Time zone: UTC+1 (CET)
  - Summer (DST): UTC+2 (CEST)

Štedrica is a village in Croatia.

== Demographics ==
According to the 2021 census, its population was 55.
