= Stupa, Croatia =

Stupa
- Village
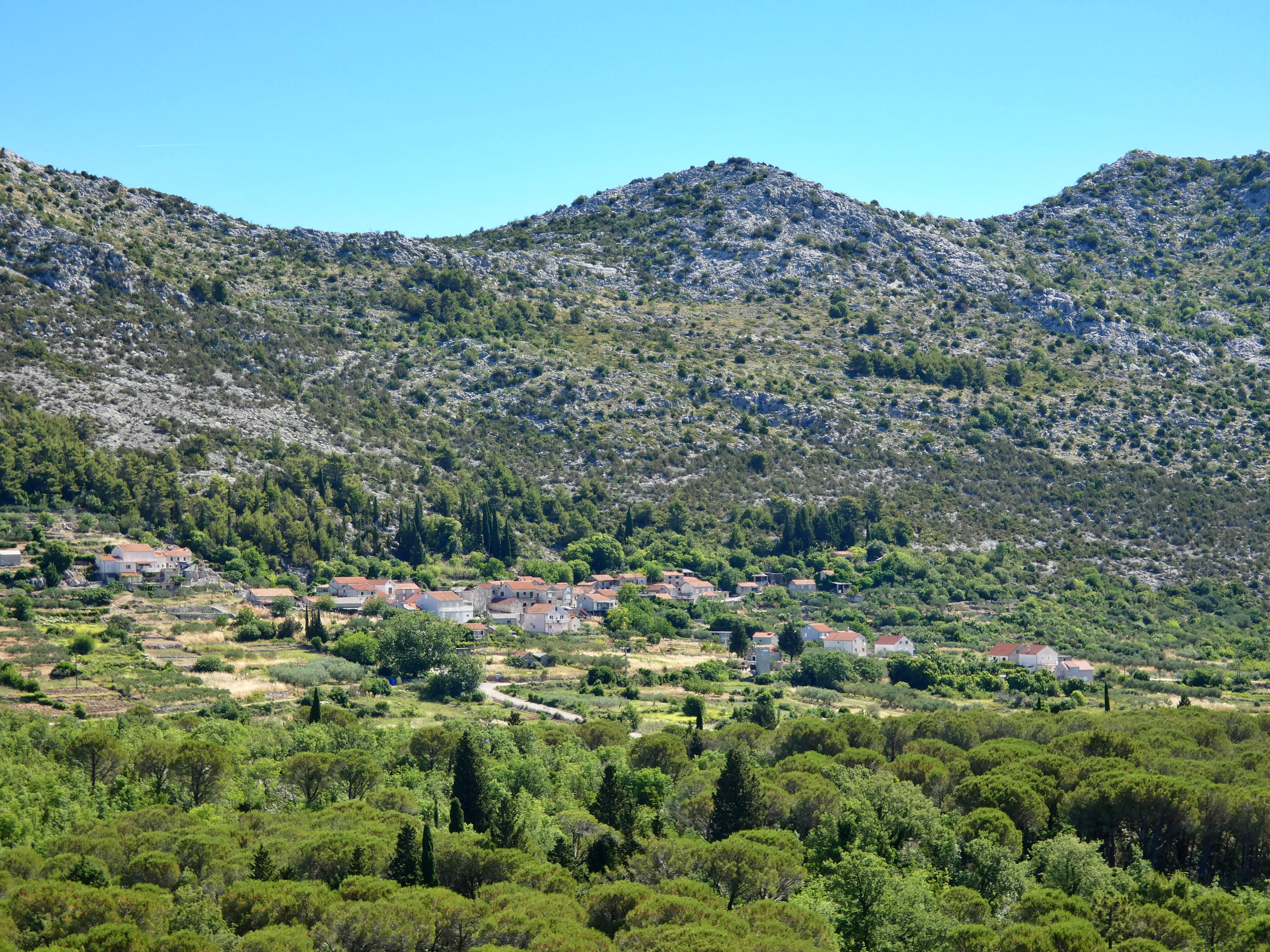

- Location within Croatia
- Coordinates: 42.8917894°N 17.6761444°E
- Country: Croatia
- County: Dubrovnik-Neretva County
- Municipality: Dubrovačko Primorje

Area
  - Total: 2.1 sq mi (5.5 km^{2})

Population (2021)
  - Total: 51
  - Density: 24/sq mi (9.3/km^{2})
- Time zone: UTC+1 (CET)
  - Summer (DST): UTC+2 (CEST)

Stupa is a village in Croatia.

== Demographics ==
According to the 2021 census, its population was 51.
