= Trnovica, Dubrovnik-Neretva County =

Trnovica
- Village
- Location within Croatia
- Coordinates: 42.8965906°N 17.8062522°E
- Country: Croatia
- County: Dubrovnik-Neretva County
- Municipality: Dubrovačko Primorje

Area
  - Total: 4.7 sq mi (12.3 km^{2})

Population (2021)
  - Total: 27
  - Density: 5.7/sq mi (2.2/km^{2})
- Time zone: UTC+1 (CET)
  - Summer (DST): UTC+2 (CEST)

Trnovica is a village in Croatia.

== Demographics ==
According to the 2021 census, its population was 27.
