= Majkovi =

- Village
- Location within Croatia
- Coordinates: 42.7752253°N 17.883327°E
- Country: Croatia
- County: Dubrovnik-Neretva County
- Municipality: Dubrovačko Primorje

Area
  - Total: 11.2 sq mi (28.9 km^{2})

Population (2021)
  - Total: 122
  - Density: 10.9/sq mi (4.22/km^{2})
- Time zone: UTC+1 (CET)
  - Summer (DST): UTC+2 (CEST)

Majkovi is a village in Croatia.

== Demographics ==
According to the 2021 census, its population was 122.
