= Smokovljani =

- Village
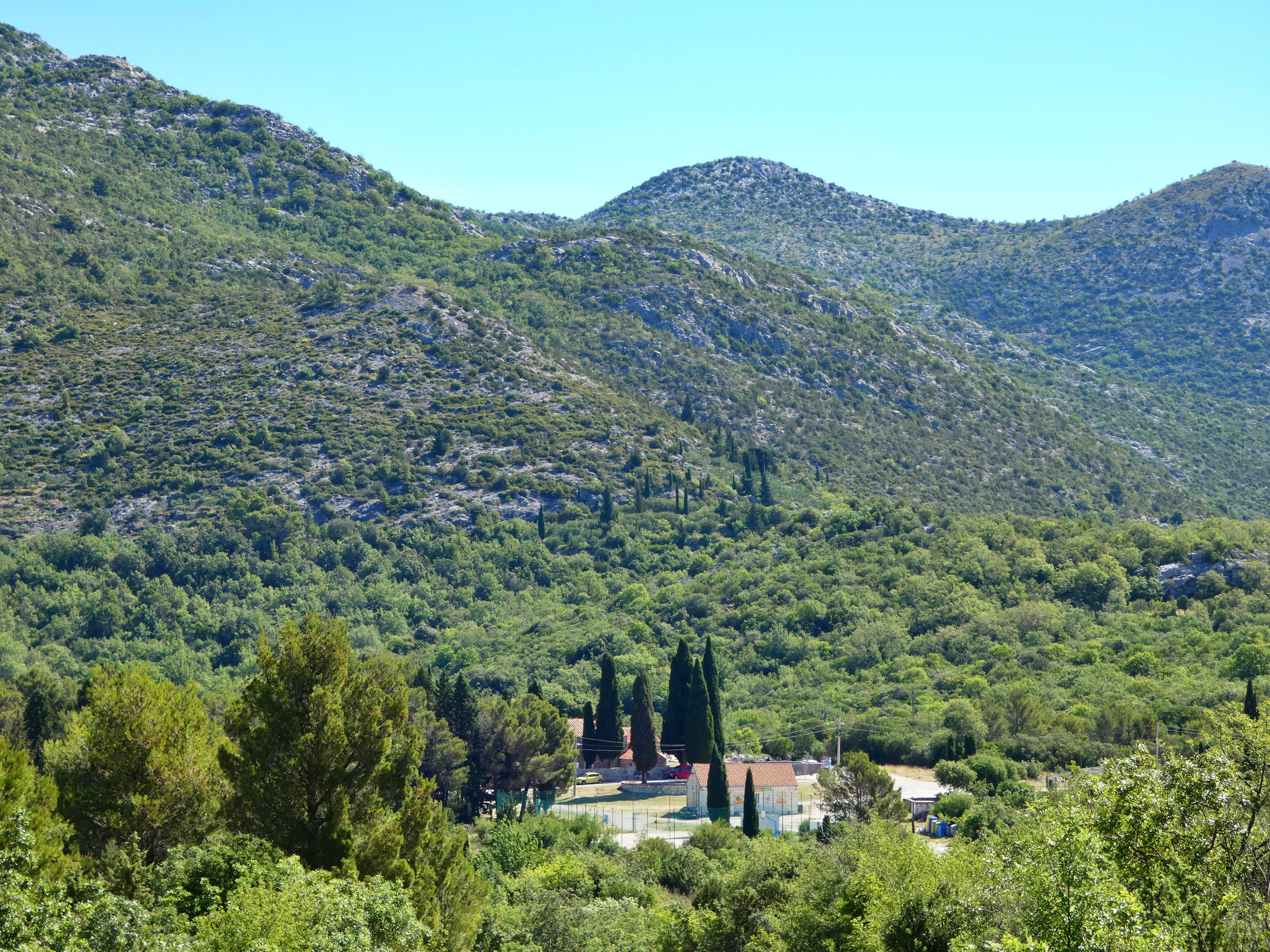

- Location within Croatia
- Coordinates: 42.8685591°N 17.720468°E
- Country: Croatia
- County: Dubrovnik-Neretva County
- Municipality: Dubrovačko Primorje

Area
  - Total: 5.9 sq mi (15.4 km^{2})

Population (2021)
  - Total: 49
  - Density: 8.2/sq mi (3.2/km^{2})
- Time zone: UTC+1 (CET)
  - Summer (DST): UTC+2 (CEST)

Smokovljani is a village in Croatia.

== Demographics ==
According to the 2021 census, its population was 49.
