= Doli, Dubrovnik-Neretva County =

Doli
- Village
- Location within Croatia
- Coordinates: 42.8118798°N 17.738327°E
- Country: Croatia
- County: Dubrovnik-Neretva County
- Municipality: Dubrovačko Primorje

Area
  - Total: 5.4 sq mi (14.0 km^{2})

Population (2021)
  - Total: 148
  - Density: 27.4/sq mi (10.6/km^{2})
- Time zone: UTC+1 (CET)
  - Summer (DST): UTC+2 (CEST)

Doli is a village in Croatia.

== Demographics ==
According to the 2021 census, its population was 148.
