= Kručica =

- Village
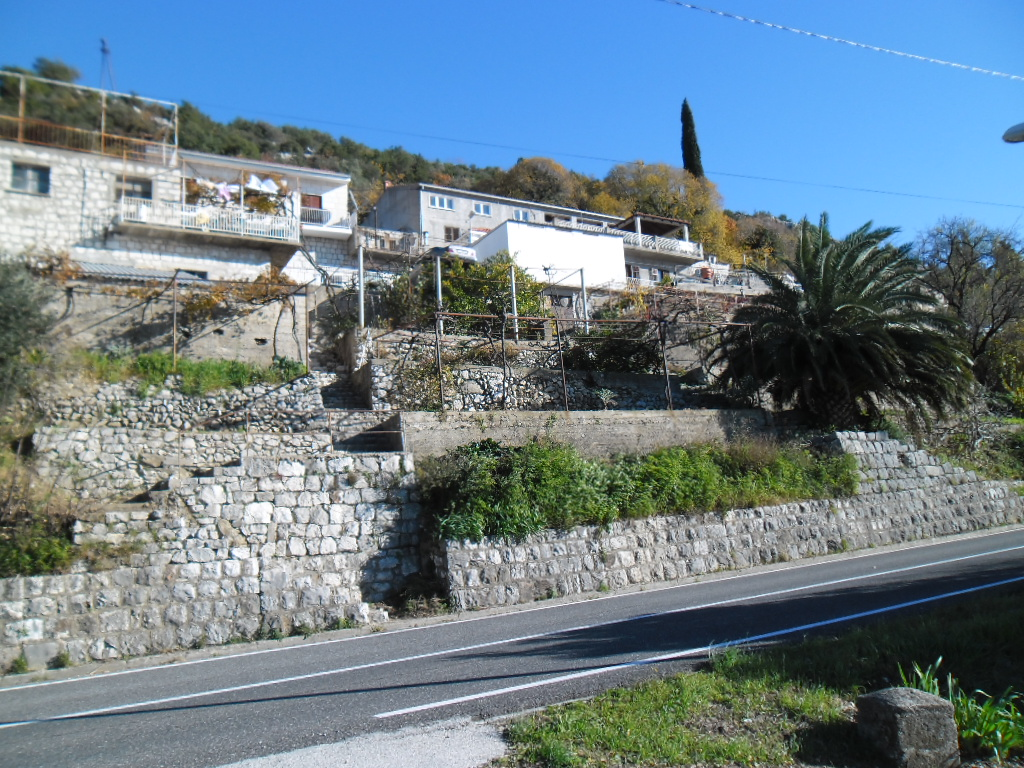
- Kručica village

- Location within Croatia
- Coordinates: 42.7890035°N 17.8430731°E
- Country: Croatia
- County: Dubrovnik-Neretva County
- Municipality: Dubrovačko Primorje

Area
  - Total: 0.35 sq mi (0.9 km^{2})

Population (2021)
  - Total: 27
  - Density: 78/sq mi (30/km^{2})
- Time zone: UTC+1 (CET)
  - Summer (DST): UTC+2 (CEST)

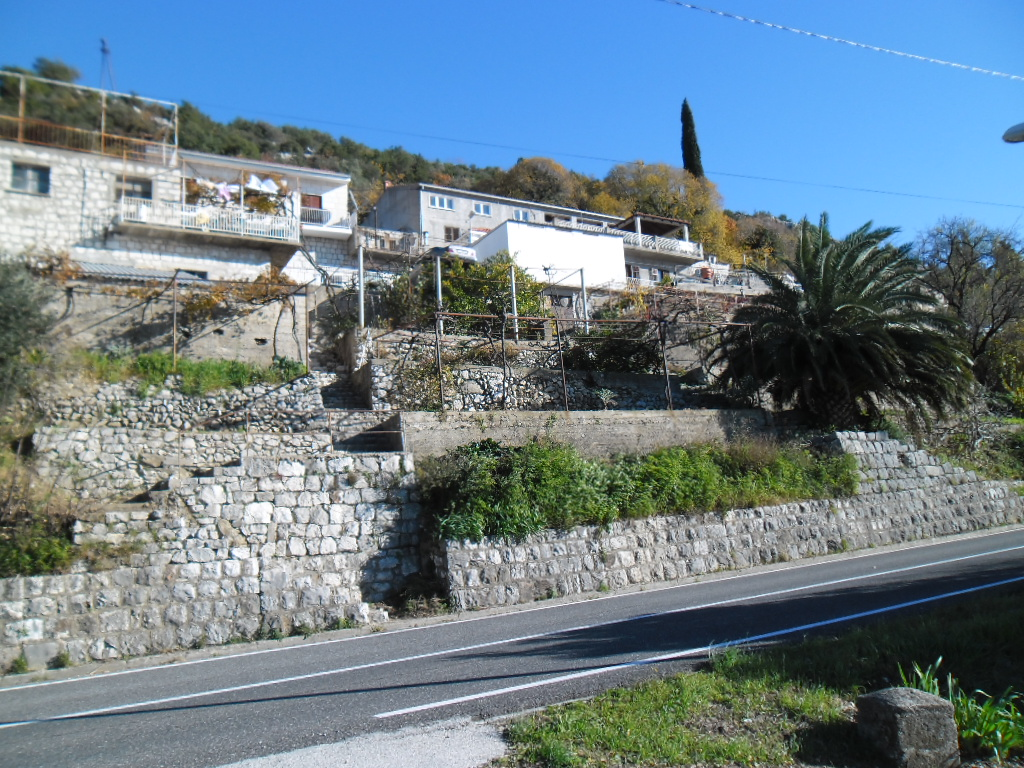
Kručica village, Dubrovnik coast

Kručica is a village in Croatia.

== Demographics ==
According to the 2021 census, its population was 27.
