= Dubrovačko Primorje =

- Municipality
- Općina Dubrovačko primorje Municipality of Dubrovačko Primorje
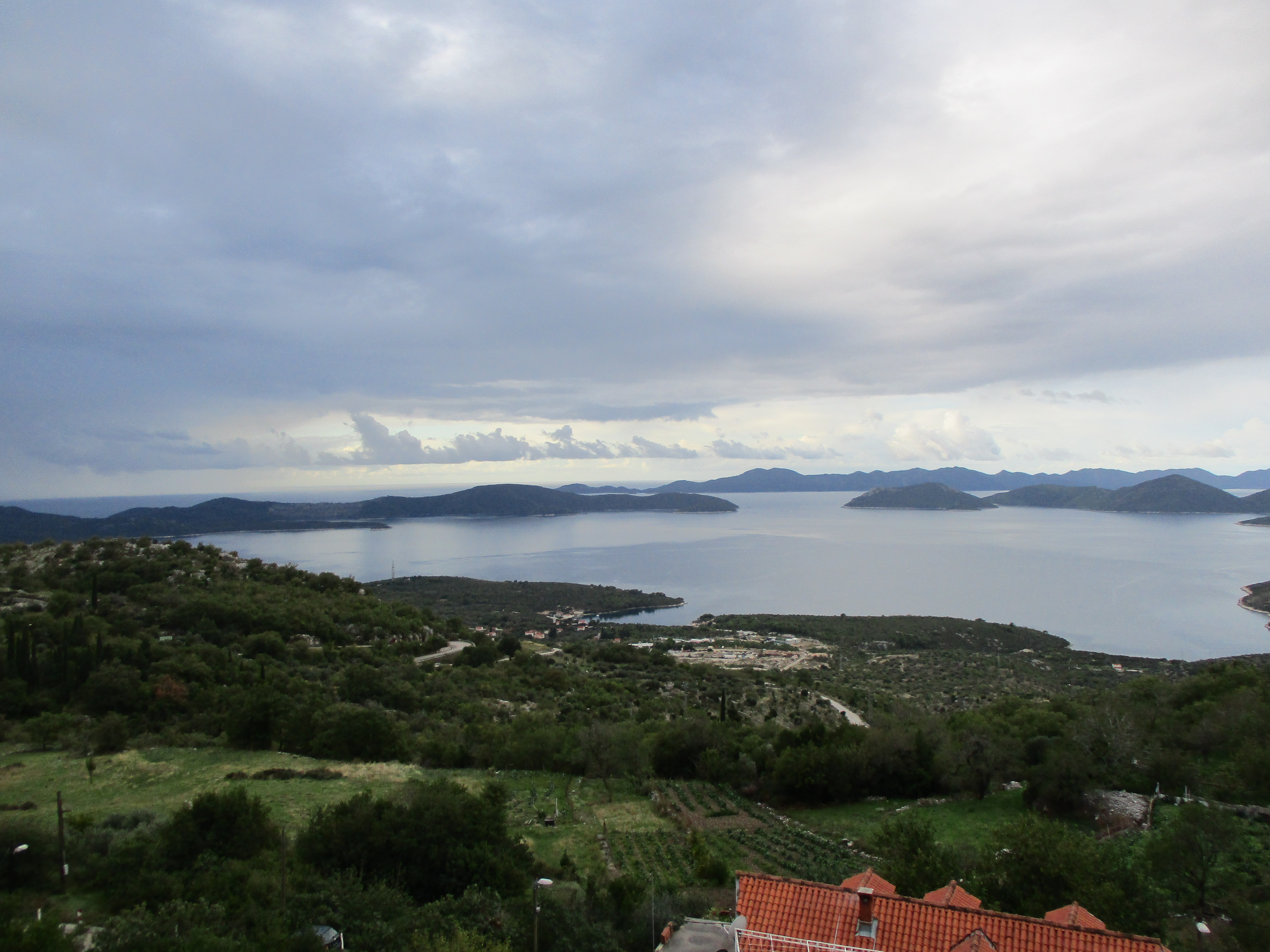
- Landscape

- Location within Croatia
- Coordinates: 42°47′N 17°53′E
- Country: Croatia
- County: Dubrovnik-Neretva County

Government
  - Municipal mayor: Nikola Knežić (HDZ)

Area
  - Total: 201.45 km^{2} (77.78 sq mi)

Population (2021)
  - Total: 1,636
  - Density: 8.121/km^{2} (21.03/sq mi)
- Time zone: UTC+1 (CET)
  - Summer (DST): UTC+2 (CEST)
- Postal code: 20232
- Area code: 020
- Vehicle registration: DU
- Website: www.dubrovackoprimorje.hr

Dubrovačko Primorje ("Dubrovnik Littoral") is a municipality situated northwest of the city Dubrovnik in Dubrovnik-Neretva County in southern Croatia. The municipality's borders extend all the way up to Neum, Bosnia and Herzegovina. The center of the municipality is the village of Slano. Dubrovačko Primorje is underdeveloped municipality which is statistically classified as the First Category Area of Special State Concern by the Government of Croatia.

== Demographics ==
In 2021, the municipality had 1,636 residents in the following 20 settlements:

- Banići, population 124
- Čepikuće, population 35
- Doli, population 148
- Imotica, population 47
- Kručica, population 27
- Lisac, population 23
- Majkovi, population 122
- Mravnica, population 29
- Ošlje, population 55
- Podgora, population 13
- Podimoć, population 17
- Slano, population 577
- Smokovljani, population 49
- Stupa, population 51
- Štedrica, population 55
- Točionik, population 16
- Topolo, population 92
- Trnova, population 27
- Trnovica, population 27
- Visočani, population 102
Dubrovačko primorje: Population trends 1857–2021
v

| population | 4689 | 4496 | 4610 | 4976 | 5271 | 5267 | 4818 | 4781 | 4554 | 4574 | 4263 | 3565 | 2823 | 2378 | 2216 | 2170 | 1636 |
| | 1857 | 1869 | 1880 | 1890 | 1900 | 1910 | 1921 | 1931 | 1948 | 1953 | 1961 | 1971 | 1981 | 1991 | 2001 | 2011 | 2021 |

Sources: Croatian Bureau of Statistics publications
