= Mravnica, Dubrovnik-Neretva County =

Mravnica
- Village
- Location within Croatia
- Coordinates: 42.8343698°N 17.8193879°E
- Country: Croatia
- County: Dubrovnik-Neretva County
- Municipality: Dubrovačko Primorje

Area
  - Total: 3.4 sq mi (8.8 km^{2})

Population (2021)
  - Total: 29
  - Density: 8.5/sq mi (3.3/km^{2})
- Time zone: UTC+1 (CET)
  - Summer (DST): UTC+2 (CEST)

Mravnica is a village in Croatia.

== Demographics ==
According to the 2021 census, its population was 29.
