= Topolo =

- Village
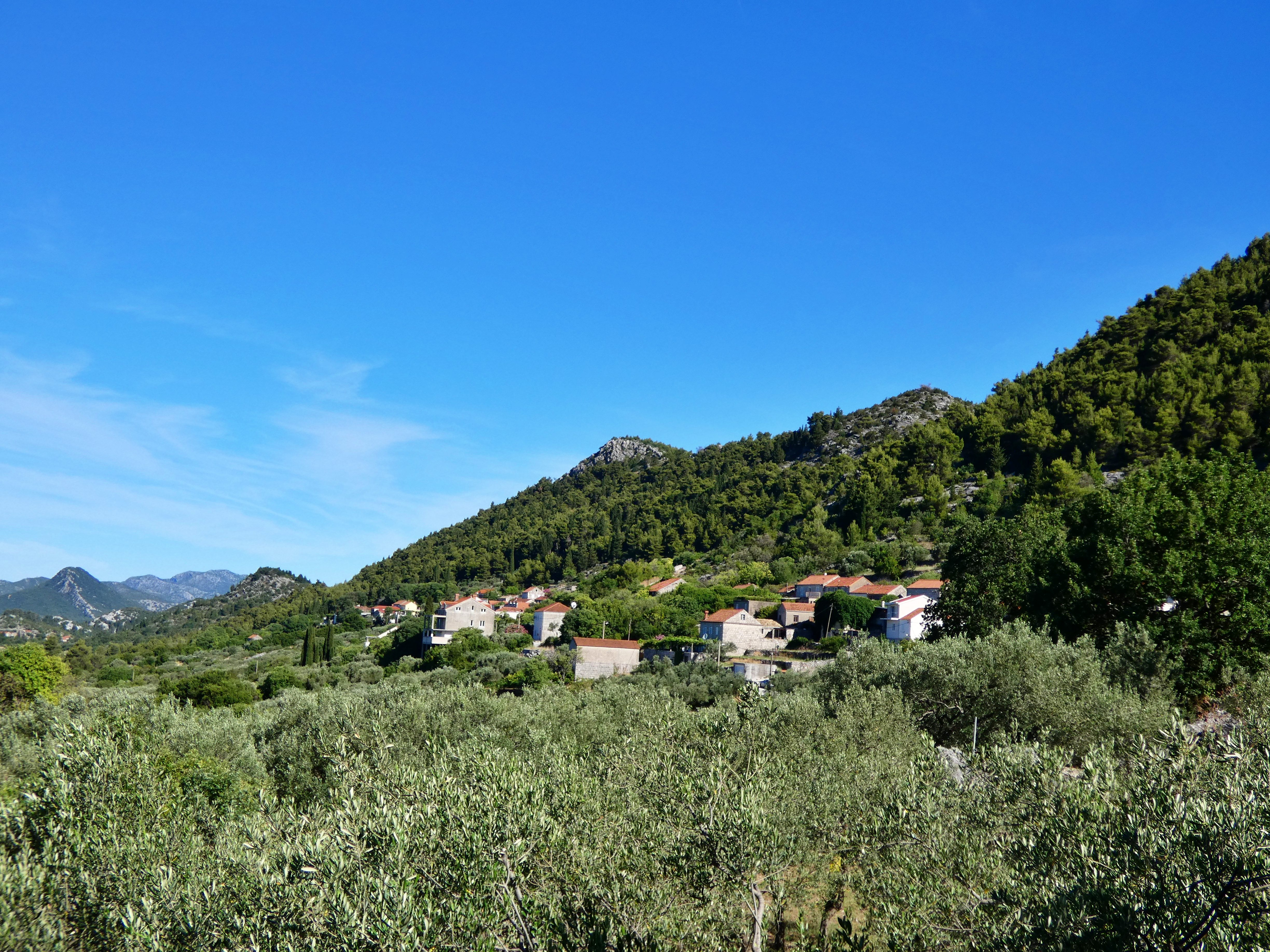

- Location within Croatia
- Coordinates: 42.9079581°N 17.6876593°E
- Country: Croatia
- County: Dubrovnik-Neretva County
- Municipality: Dubrovačko Primorje

Area
  - Total: 3.0 sq mi (7.8 km^{2})

Population (2021)
  - Total: 92
  - Density: 31/sq mi (12/km^{2})
- Time zone: UTC+1 (CET)
  - Summer (DST): UTC+2 (CEST)

Topolo is a village in Croatia.

== Demographics ==
According to the 2021 census, its population was 92.
