= Lisac, Dubrovnik-Neretva County =

Lisac
- Village
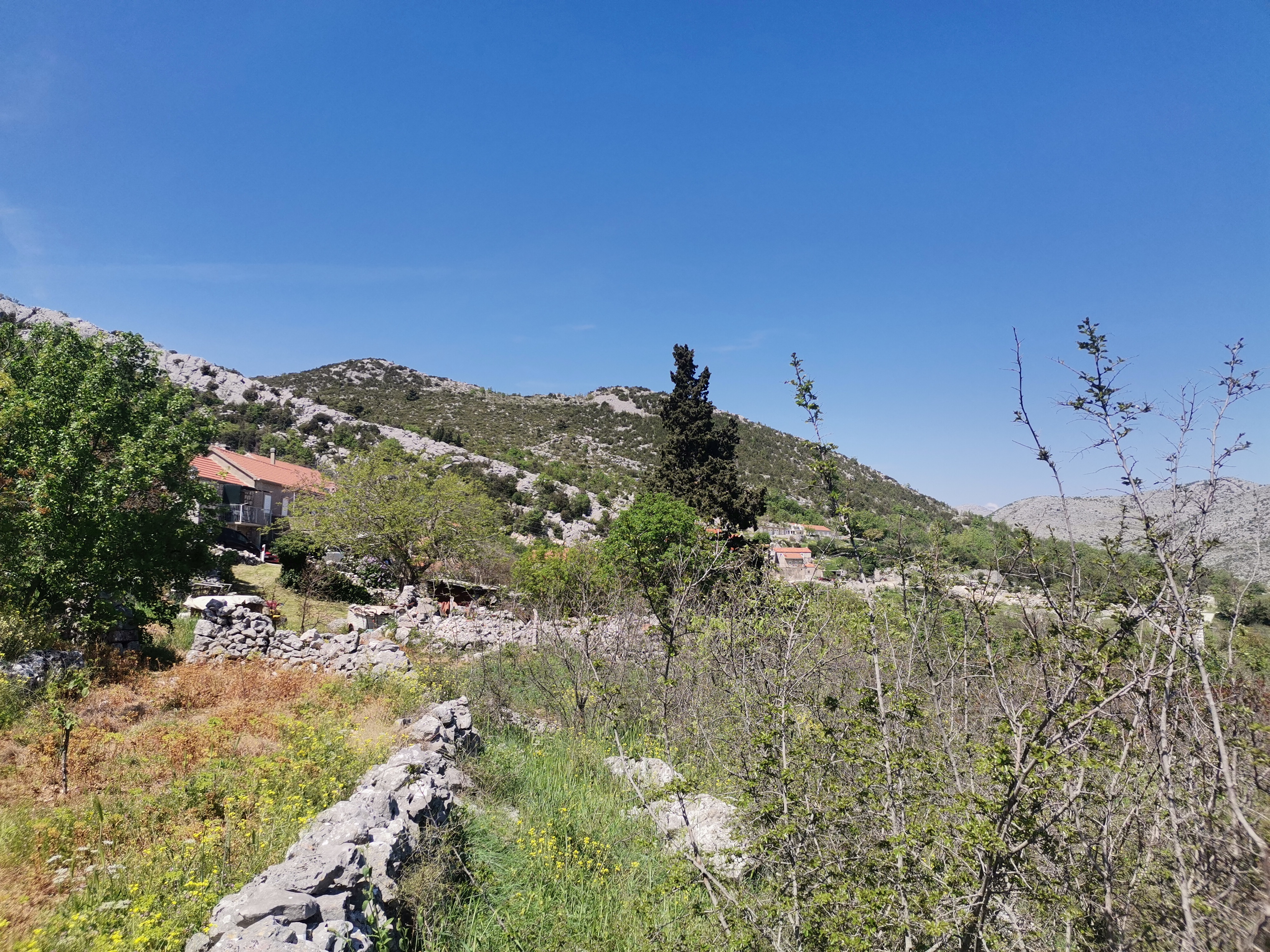
- Selo Lisac

- Location within Croatia
- Coordinates: 42.8453077°N 17.7881749°E
- Country: Croatia
- County: Dubrovnik-Neretva County
- Municipality: Dubrovačko Primorje

Area
  - Total: 3.1 sq mi (8.0 km^{2})

Population (2021)
  - Total: 101
  - Density: 33/sq mi (13/km^{2})
- Time zone: UTC+1 (CET)
  - Summer (DST): UTC+2 (CEST)

Lisac is a village in Croatia.

== Demographics ==
According to the 2021 census, its population was 23.
