= Točionik, Croatia =

Settlement in Dubrovnik-Neretva County, Croatia

Točionik
- Settlement
- Interactive map of Točionik
- Location of Točionik in Croatia
- Coordinates: 42°52′16″N 17°48′50″E
- Country: Croatia
- County: Dubrovnik-Neretva
- Municipality: Dubrovačko primorje

Area
  - Total: 10.8 km^{2} (4.2 sq mi)

Population (2021)
  - Total: 16
  - Density: 1.5/km^{2} (3.8/sq mi)
- Time zone: UTC+1 (CET)
  - Summer (DST): UTC+2 (CEST)
- Postal code: 20230 Ston
- Area code: +385 (0)20

Točionik is a settlement in the Municipality of Dubrovačko primorje in Croatia. In 2021, its population was 16.

== Demographics ==
Točionik: Population trends 1857–2021
v

population	171	147	173	168	181	193	172	160	152	161	143	101	63	43	26	23	16
	1857	1869	1880	1890	1900	1910	1921	1931	1948	1953	1961	1971	1981	1991	2001	2011	2021

Sources: Croatian Bureau of Statistics publications
