= Mravnica, Šibenik-Knin County =

Settlement in Šibenik-Knin County, Croatia

Mravnica
- Settlement
- Interactive map of Mravnica
- Location of Mravnica in Croatia
- Coordinates: 43°39′00″N 16°07′01″E
- Country: Croatia
- County: Šibenik-Knin
- City: Šibenik

Area
  - Total: 2.5 km^{2} (0.97 sq mi)

Population (2021)
  - Total: 29
  - Density: 12/km^{2} (30/sq mi)
- Time zone: UTC+1 (CET)
  - Summer (DST): UTC+2 (CEST)
- Postal code: 22000 Šibenik

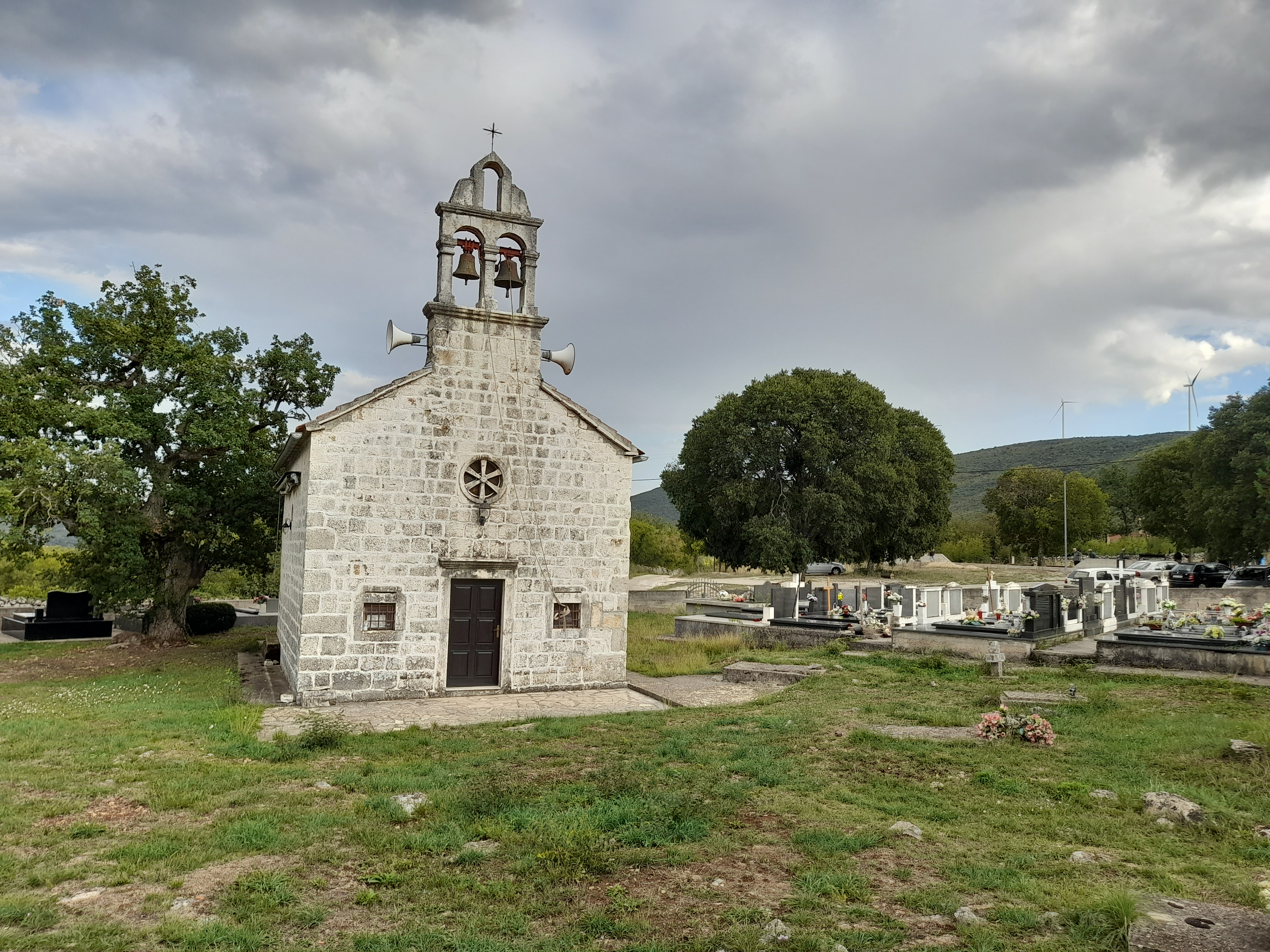
Mravnica

Mravnica is a settlement in the City of Šibenik in Croatia. In 2021, its population was 29.

== Demographics ==
Mravnica: Population trends 1857–2021
v

population	38		157	99	111	124	160	174	199	157	258	166	149	121	62	70	29
	1857	1869	1880	1890	1900	1910	1921	1931	1948	1953	1961	1971	1981	1991	2001	2011	2021

Sources: Croatian Bureau of Statistics publications
