= Ošlje =

- Village
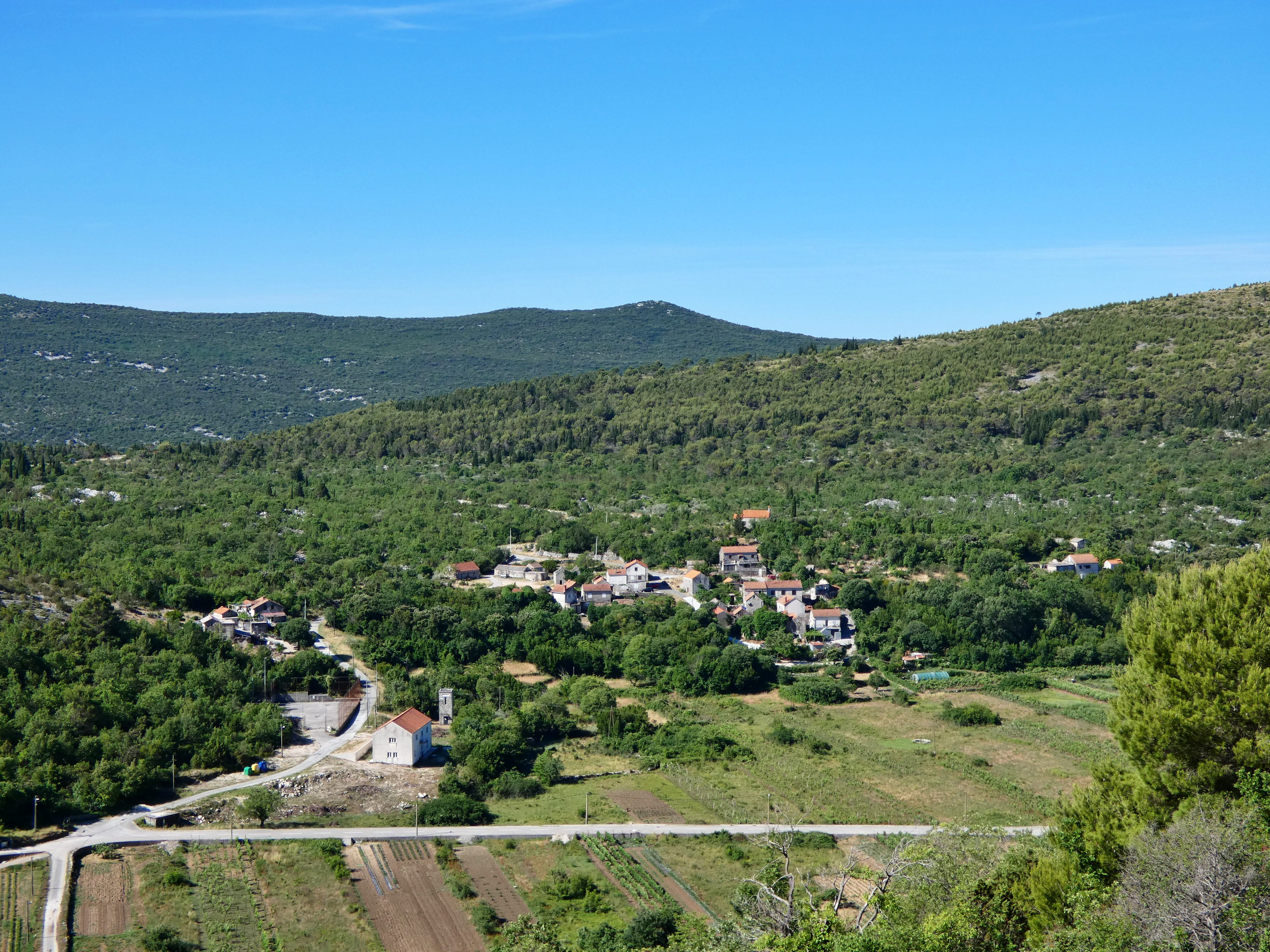

- Location within Croatia
- Coordinates: 42.8842615°N 17.7007493°E
- Country: Croatia
- County: Dubrovnik-Neretva County
- Municipality: Dubrovačko Primorje

Area
  - Total: 6.9 sq mi (17.9 km^{2})

Population (2021)
  - Total: 3
  - Density: 0.43/sq mi (0.17/km^{2})
- Time zone: UTC+1 (CET)
  - Summer (DST): UTC+2 (CEST)

Ošlje is a village in Croatia.

== Demographics ==
According to the 2021 census, its population was 55.
