= Visočani =

- Village
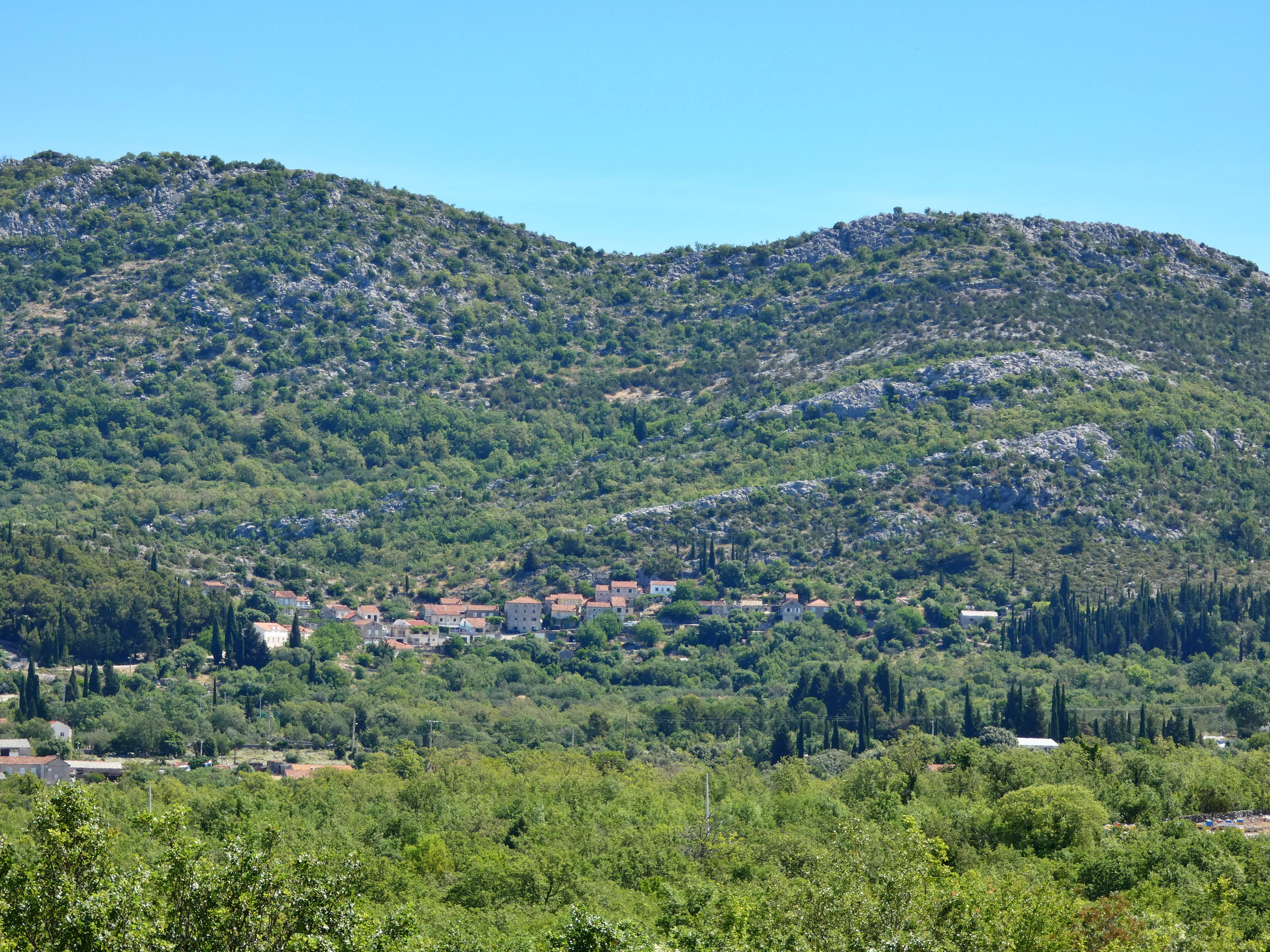

- Location within Croatia
- Coordinates: 42.8508503°N 17.762926°E
- Country: Croatia
- County: Dubrovnik-Neretva County
- Municipality: Dubrovačko Primorje

Area
  - Total: 3.7 sq mi (9.6 km^{2})

Population (2021)
  - Total: 102
  - Density: 28/sq mi (11/km^{2})
- Time zone: UTC+1 (CET)
  - Summer (DST): UTC+2 (CEST)

Visočani is a village in Croatia.

== Demographics ==
According to the 2021 census, its population was 102.
