= Slano =

- Village
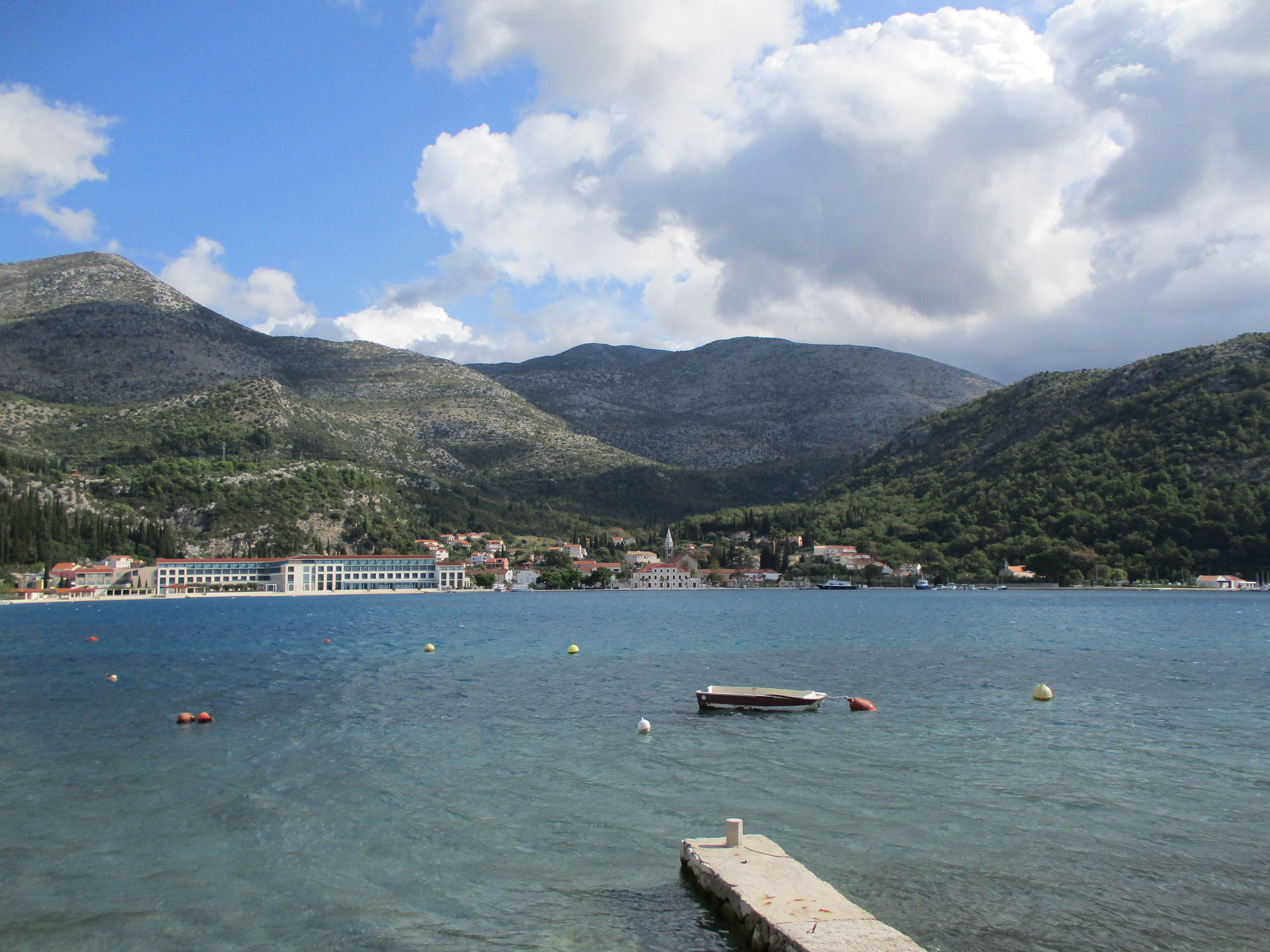
- Slano
- Interactive map of Slano
- Location within Croatia
- Coordinates: 42°47′13″N 17°53′24″E
- Country: Croatia
- County: Dubrovnik-Neretva County
- Municipality: Dubrovačko Primorje

Area
  - Total: 4.7 sq mi (12.3 km^{2})

Population (2021)
  - Total: 577
  - Density: 121/sq mi (46.9/km^{2})
- Time zone: UTC+1 (CET)
  - Summer (DST): UTC+2 (CEST)
- Postal code: 20232 Slano

Slano is a village in southern Croatia with a small harbour in the bay of the same name. It is located 27 km northwest of Dubrovnik.

== History ==
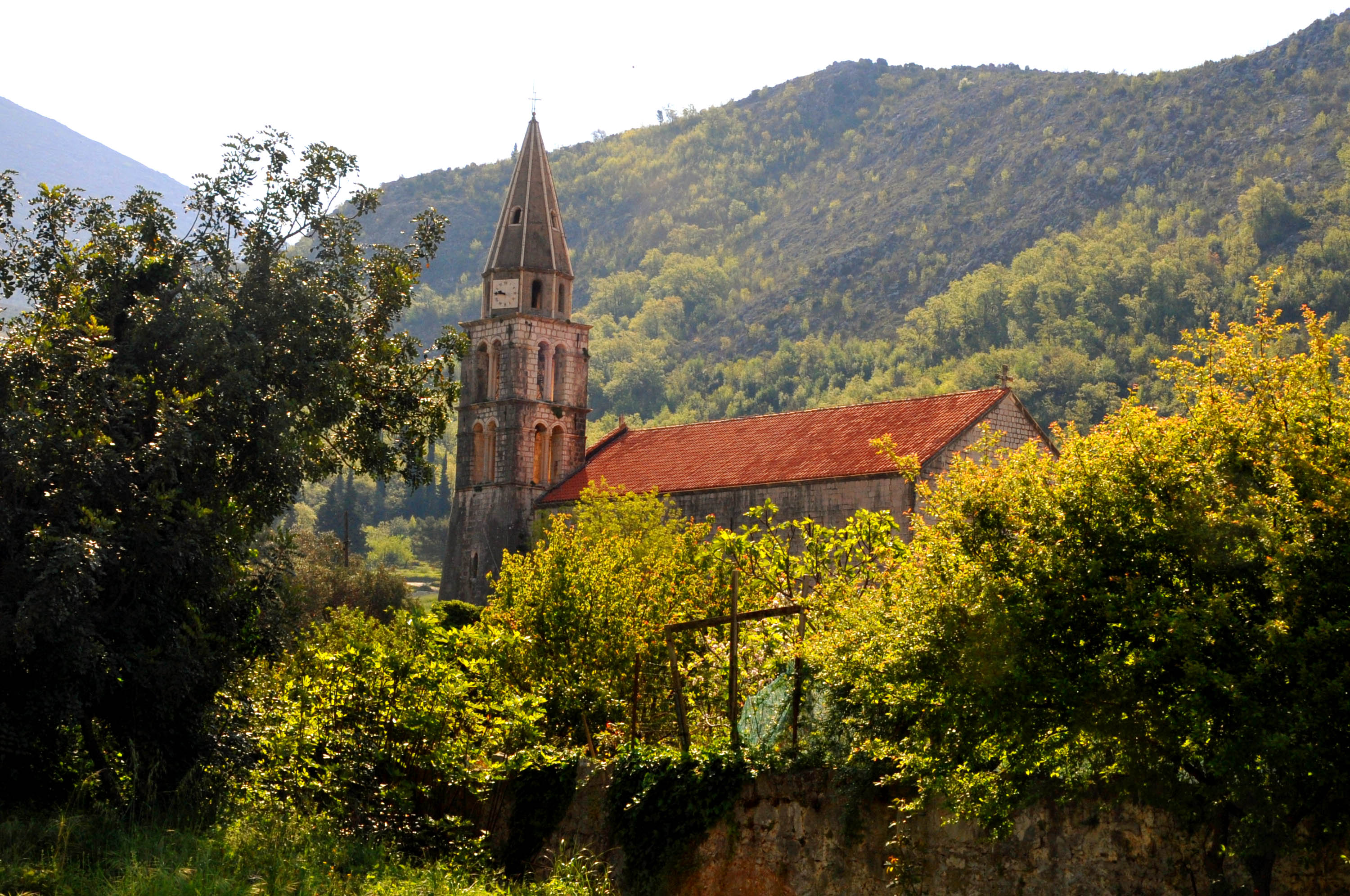
Franciscan church in Slano

The area of Slano was already populated in the prehistoric period (ruins of a hill-fort and tumuli on the nearby hills) and in ancient times (a Roman castrum on the hill Gradina; early Christian sarcophagi, today exhibited in front of the Franciscan church). In 1399, Slano fell under the rule of the Republic of Ragusa; once the duke's seat (duke's palace, reconstructed at the end of the 19th century). The summer villa of the Ohmučević family is situated in the vicinity.

The present Franciscan church was built in the 16th century; the main altar is adorned with a polyptych by Lovro Dobričević. The parish church of Saint Blaise from 1407 was reconstructed in the Baroque period. The churches of the Annunciation and of St. Peter, both dating back to the 13th century, are located in Banja.

== Demographics ==
According to the 2021 census, its population was 577. It was 579 in 2011.

== Today ==
Farming, olive-growing, viniculture, fruit-growing, tobacco, herbs (sage, laurel), fishing and tourism are the main occupations. Slano lies on the main coastal road (M2, E65). Yachts can anchor in the small protected Banja cove and an anchoring-ground for larger yachts lies off the entrance to the cove, to the southwest of Cape Gornji.

== Gallery ==
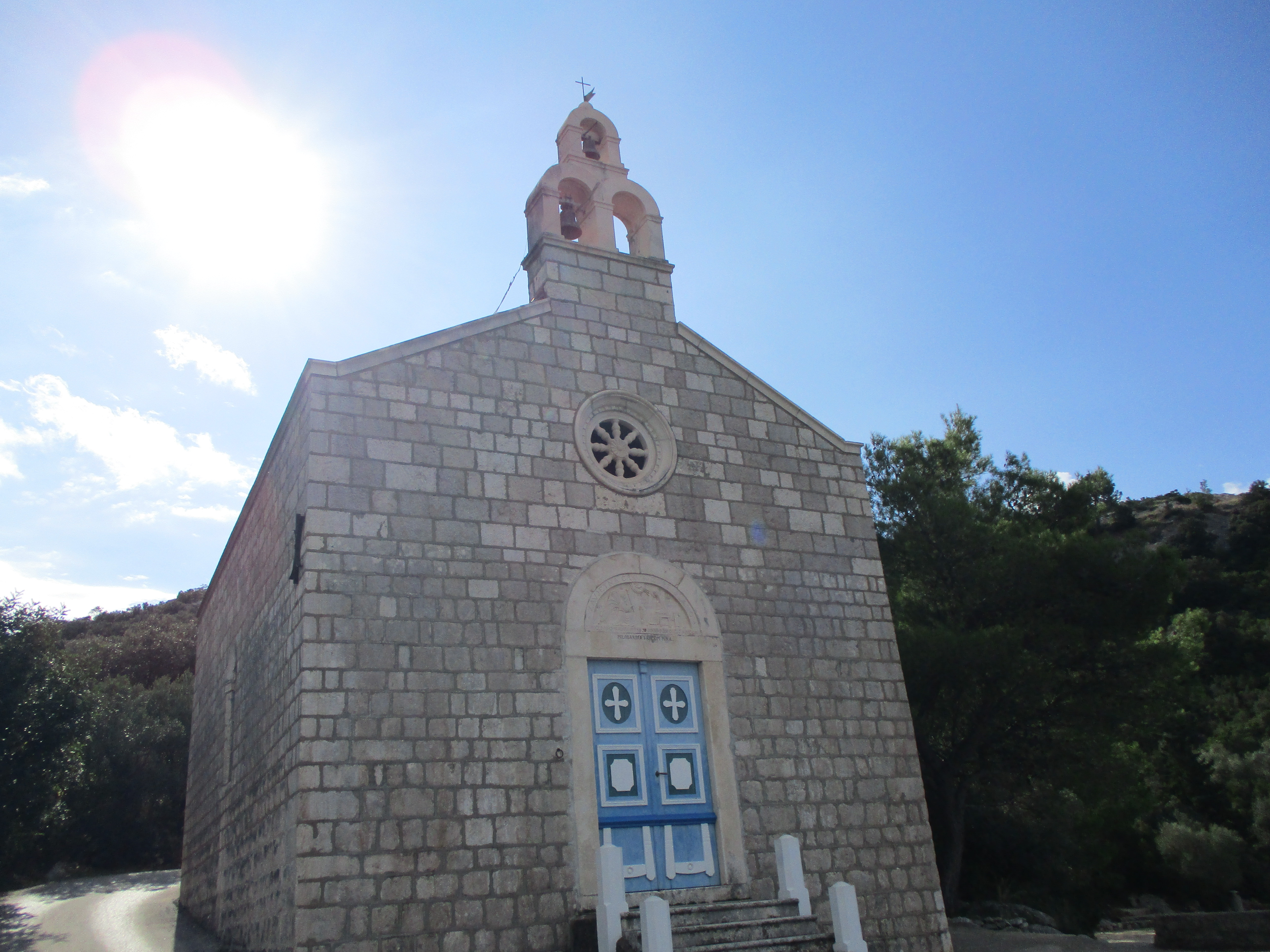

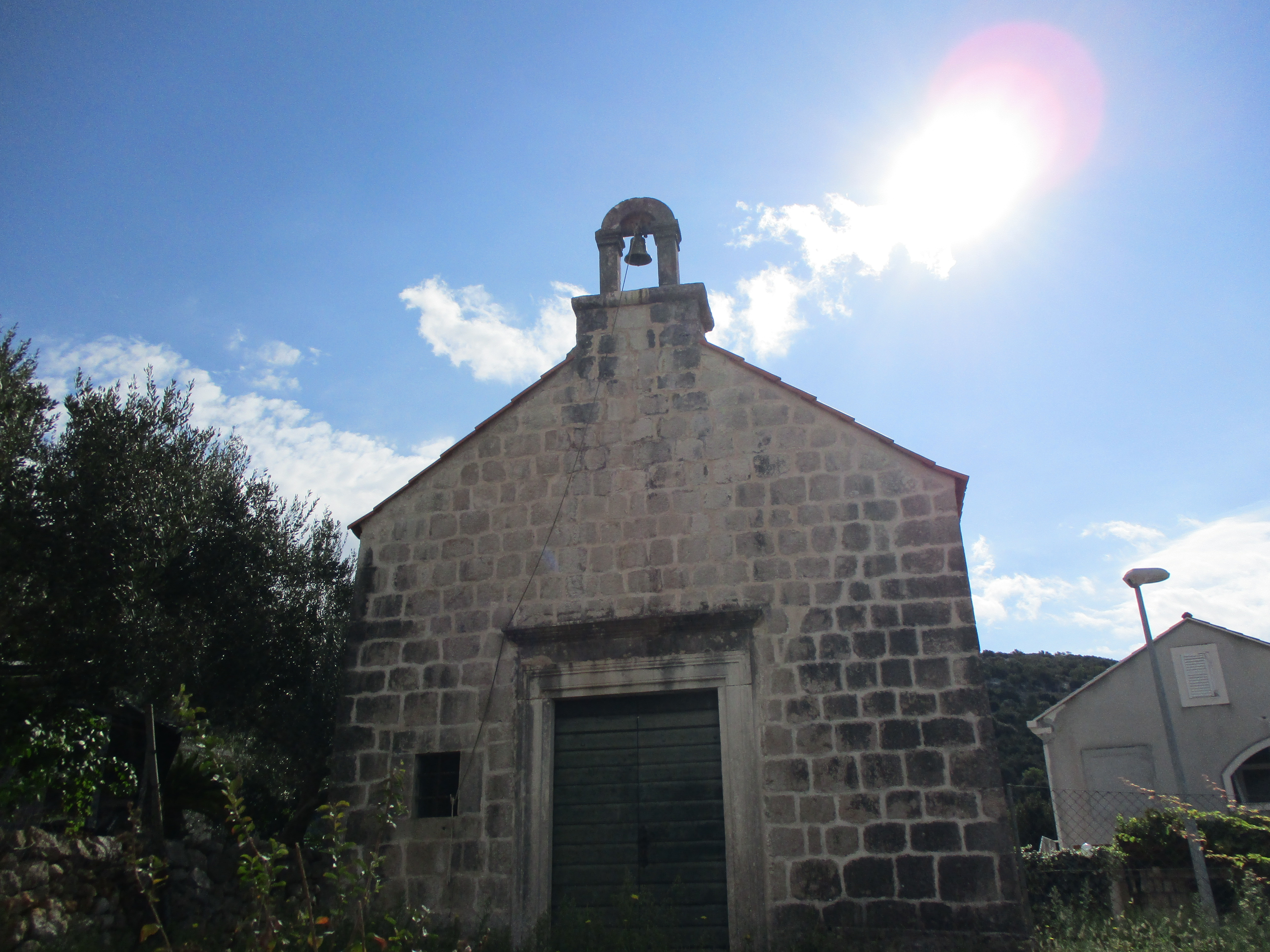

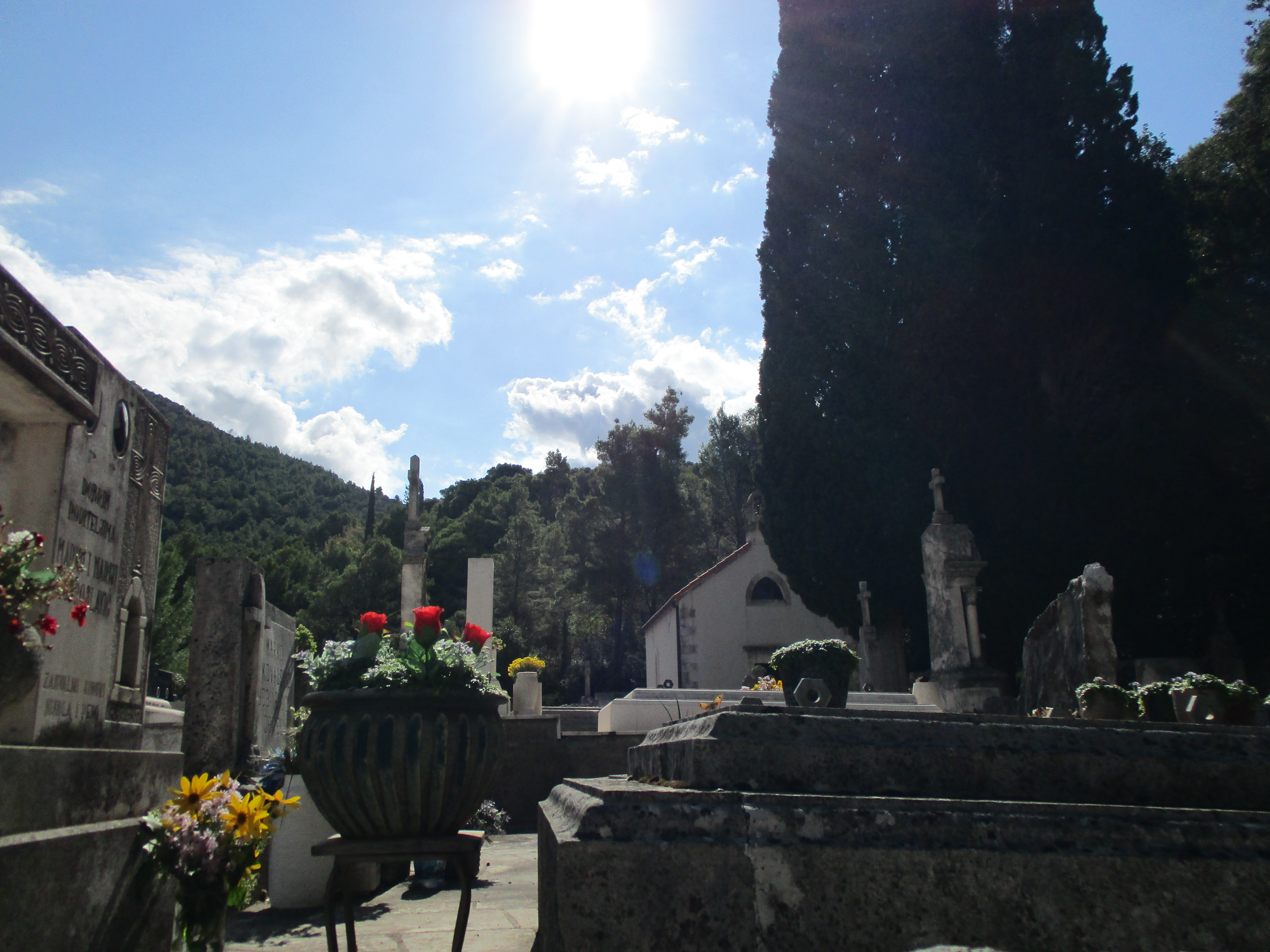

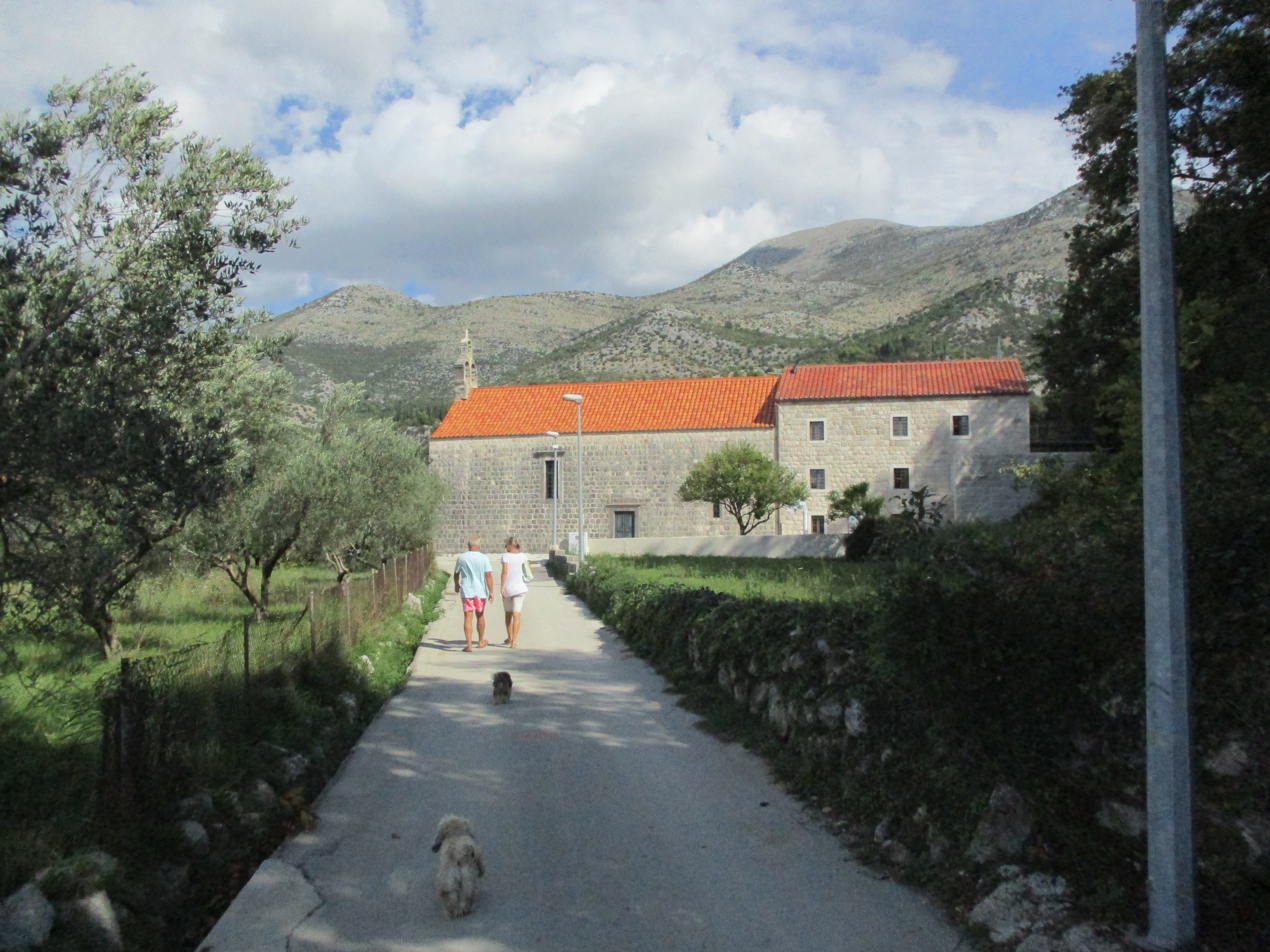

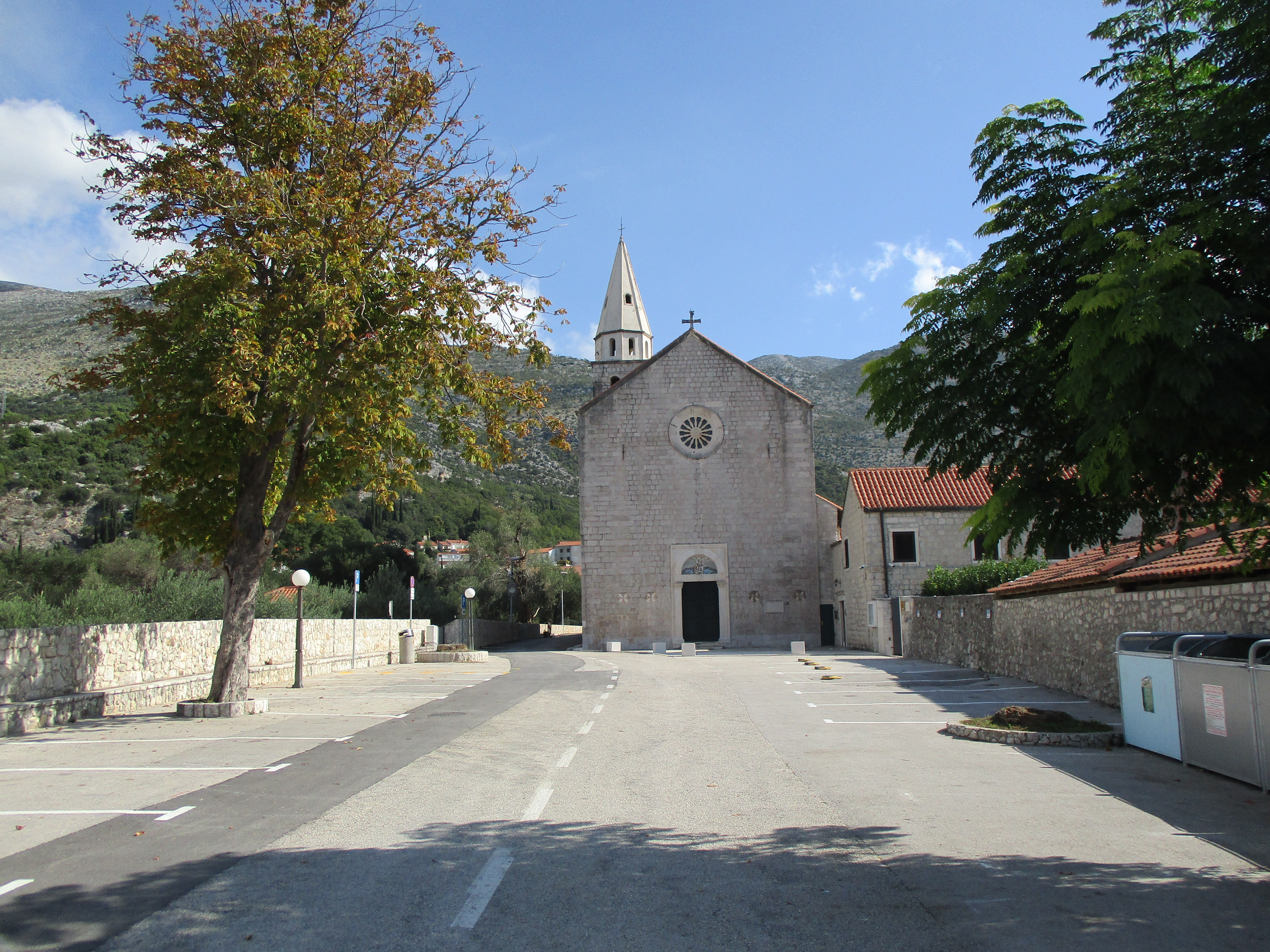

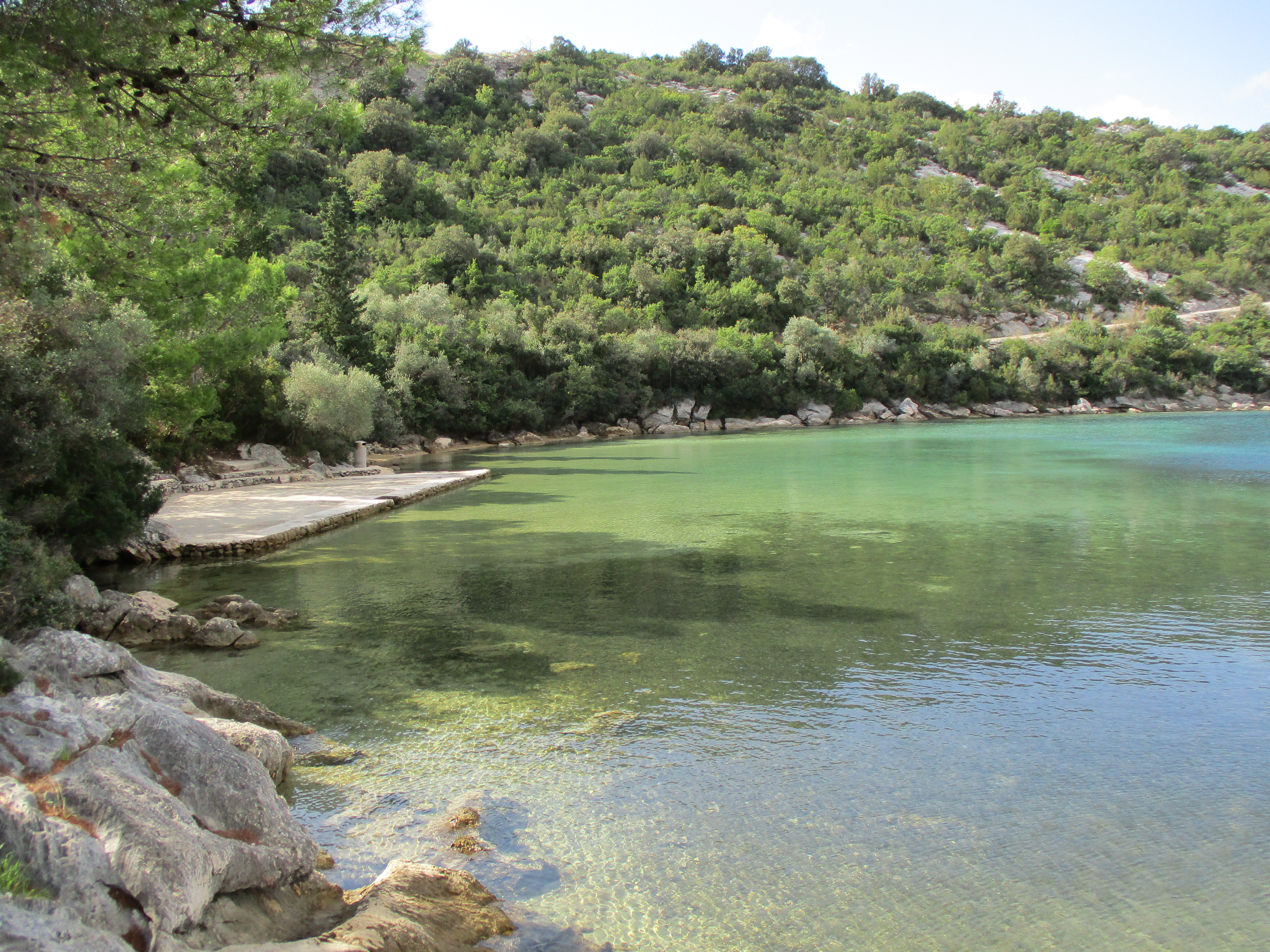
