= Dubrovnik Cathedral =

- Assumption Cathedral
- Croatian: Katedrala Velike Gospe; Katedrala Marijina Uznesenja
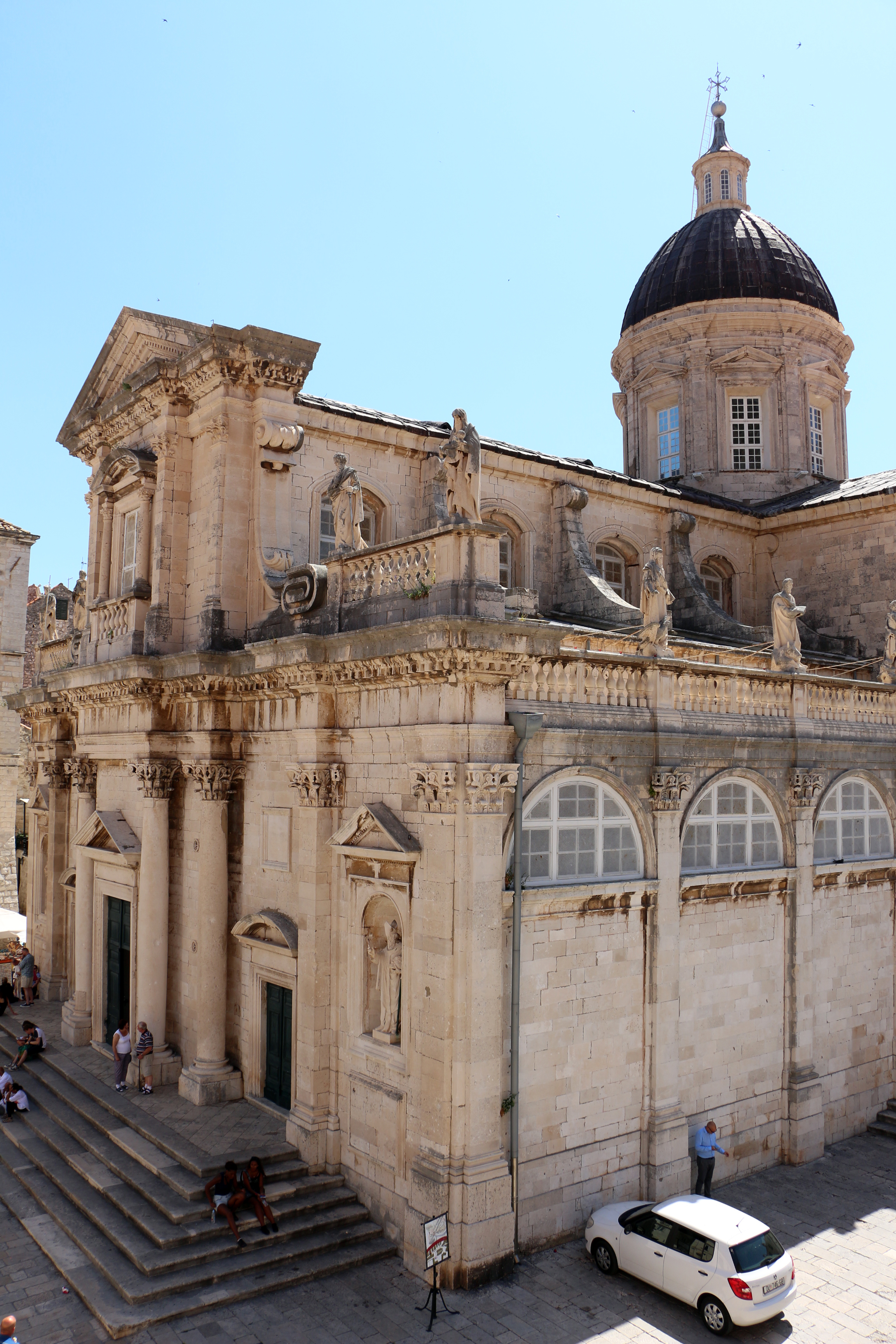
- Cathedral facade, seen from Rector's Palace
- Dubrovnik Cathedral
- 42°38′24″N 18°06′37″E
- Location: Dubrovnik
- Country: Croatia
- Denomination: Roman Catholic

History
- Status: Cathedral
- Dedication: Assumption of Mary

Architecture
- Functional status: Active
- Architect(s): Lorenzo Bernini, Carlo Fontana and Ilija Katičić
- Architectural type: Baroque
- Years built: 42 years
- Groundbreaking: 1671
- Completed: 1713
- Construction cost: 100,000 ducats

Specifications
- Length: 41 m
- Width: 17 m

Administration
- Archdiocese: Split-Makarska
- Diocese: Dubrovnik

Clergy
- Archbishop: Roko Glasnović

Cultural Good of Croatia
- Type: Protected cultural good
- Reference no.: Z-6443

The Dubrovnik Cathedral (Croatian: Katedrala Velike Gospe, Katedrala Marijina Uznesenja) is a Roman Catholic cathedral in Dubrovnik, Croatia. It is the seat of the Diocese of Dubrovnik. Built in the Baroque style during the early eighteenth century on the site of earlier churches destroyed in the devastating earthquake of 1667, the cathedral is one of the city’s most important religious and architectural landmarks.

Its design is traditionally attributed to the Italian architect Andrea Buffalini, while its richly decorated interior contains notable paintings from European artist such as Titian, Padovanino, Palma il Giovane, Savoldo and others, relics, and a treasury of sacred art reflecting Dubrovnik’s historic connections with the Mediterranean world. The cathedral remains the seat of the Roman Catholic Diocese of Dubrovnik and an enduring symbol of the city’s cultural and spiritual heritage.

== History ==
=== The Byzantine Basilica ===
Archaeological excavations beneath Dubrovnik Cathedral revealed the remains of an earlier Byzantine basilica, the oldest large-scale structure identified on the site. The money to build the basilica was partially contributed by the English king Richard the Lion Heart, as a votive for having survived a shipwreck near the island of Lokrum in 1192 on his return from the Third Crusade.

The church was a three-aisled, triapsidal basilica measuring approximately 31 by 16 metres, with a broad central nave and narrower side aisles. Unlike the present cathedral, it was oriented eastward, with its main façade on the western side. The interior was divided by rows of massive masonry piers, while the sanctuary contained a central altar, a raised bema, and liturgical furnishings including a cathedra and later a synthronon for the clergy. The basilica featured timber roofing, barrel-vaulted pastophoria, and apses covered with semi-domes. Excavations also uncovered numerous fragments of Pre-Romanesque stone sculpture and liturgical furnishings, including altar screens, ciborium elements, transennas, and carved architectural decoration. Most of these remains date to the 9th century and reflect the development of early medieval interlace sculpture characteristic of the south Adriatic region. Many fragments were discovered reused in the foundations of the later Romanesque cathedral, indicating continuous rebuilding and adaptation of the site through the centuries.

=== Baroque Cathedral ===
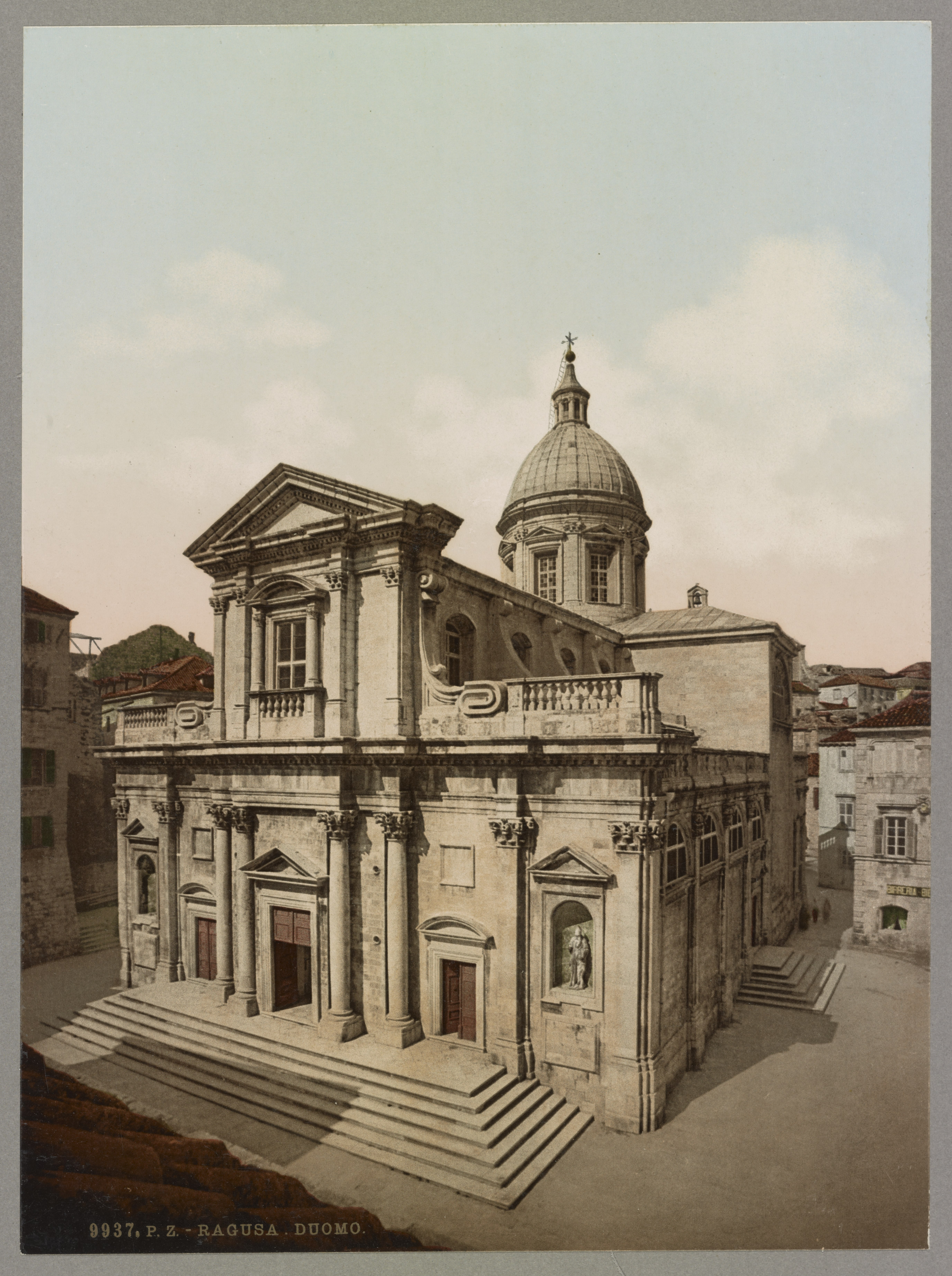
Dubrovnik Cathedral, 1890

The devastating 1667 Dubrovnik earthquake marked a turning point in the history of Dubrovnik’s architecture, severely damaging much of the city, including its churches, public buildings such as Rector's Palace and Stradun and the original cathedral. Although there were initial plans to abandon Dubrovnik and establish a new settlement on the nearby Lapad peninsula, the survival of the city walls encouraged reconstruction instead. Because local builders lacked the resources and expertise required for such extensive rebuilding, the Republic of Ragusa relied heavily on Italian architects and engineers.

The new Dubrovnik Cathedral was designed by the Roman architect Andrea Buffalini, acting under the direction of the Dubrovnik diplomat and Vatican librarian Stjepan Gradić. The design of Dubrovnik Cathedral was based on the Roman church San Giovanni dei Fiorentini in Rome, with which it shares a similar ground plan, rectangular apse, narrow elevated nave, and relatively compact dome crossing. In both churches, the massive supports of the dome strongly articulate the transition between the nave and the crossing. However, while the Roman model employed simpler vault divisions, Buffalini adapted the design by introducing pronounced transverse arches, following architectural developments of the seventeenth-century Roman Baroque. These structural elements emphasized the monumentality of the cathedral but also contributed to the comparatively narrow appearance of its aisles.

Construction began in the 1671 and continued intermittently for four decades under several other Italian architects including Francesco Cortese (present from 1669 until his death in 1670), Paolo Andreotti of Genoa (present 1671-1674), Pier Antonio Bazzi of Genoa (present 1677-78), and friar Tommaso Napoli of Palermo (present 1689 - 1700), all working with local and imported stonemasons, before being completed in 1713 by the Dubrovnik builder Ilija Katičić. Napoli made several crucial changes to the original plans including the use of a cross vault and the opening of large thermal windows at the upper level. This gives the whole interior a lighter and brighter feel. The style of the cathedral is in keeping with the esthetics of Roman Baroque architecture as practiced by Bernini, Carlo Fontana and their 17th century contemporaries. The building was finished in 1713 by the Dubrovnik architect Ilija Katičić. During the long construction process, Buffalini’s original plans were partially modified, though the cathedral retained its Baroque Architecture conception as a three-aisled basilica with side chapels and a dome built on the site of the earlier Romanesque cathedral destroyed in the earthquake.

== Recent ==
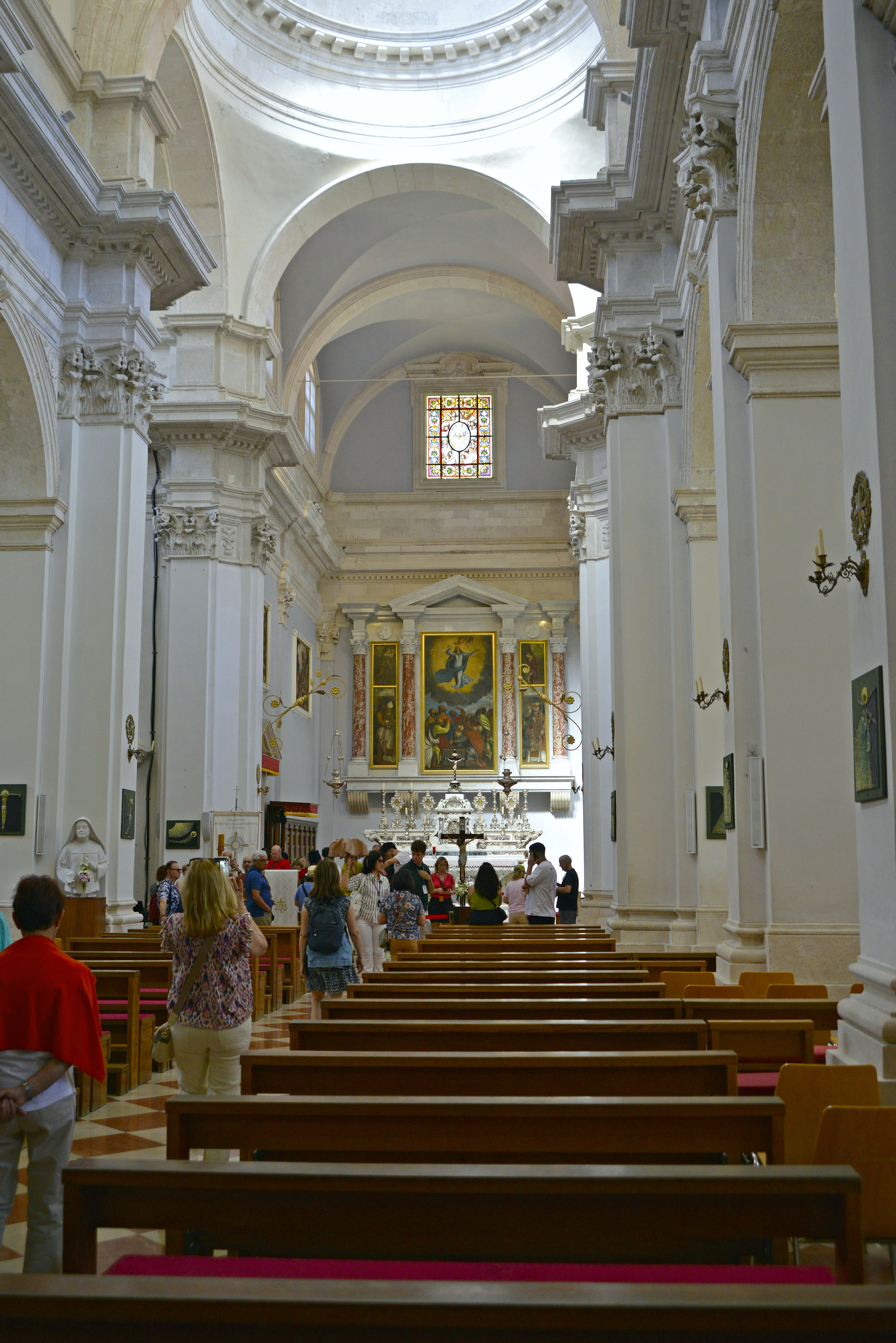
Interior of the Cathedral

The Cathedral is registered under Register of Cultural Goods of Croatia due to its unique Baroque architecture and history, and it's part of UNESCO World Heritage Site.

The building was damaged by the 1979 Montenegro earthquake, requiring several years of repairs.

The cathedral was damaged by at least one shell during the Siege of Dubrovnik in 1991. The damage has since been repaired.

== Description ==
The portal of the facade is flanked by four Corinthian columns. On top of the central part is a large Baroque window with a triangular gable and a balustrade with statues of saints. The deep niches in the facade contains statues of Saint Blaise (patron saint of Dubrovnik) and Joseph with Child. The lateral sides of the cathedral are rather plain, articulated by pillars and semicircular windows. The side entrances are smaller than the frontal portal.

The building features a high nave, separated by massive columns from the two aisles, three apses and a grand Baroque dome at the intersection of the nave and the transepts. The main altar holds a Triptych by Titian, portraying a version of Assumption of the Mary. This painting probably dates from 1552; the side altars hold paintings of Italian and Dalmatian masters of later centuries.

== Treasury ==
The Cathedral treasury (Riznica Katedrale) shows clearly the numerous connections Dubrovnik had with the main seaports in the Mediterranean Sea. The treasury holds 182 reliquaries holding relics from the 11th to 18th centuries; from local masters, Byzantium, Venice and the Orient. Its most important object is the gold-plated arm, leg and skull of Saint Blaise (patron saint of Dubrovnik). The head is in the shape of a crown of Byzantine emperors, adorned with precious stones and enameled medals. The treasury holds also a relic of the True Cross. Other outstanding examples in the treasury are a number of church vessels (13th to 18th century), many of them manufactured by local goldsmiths, and a number of valuables, such as the Romanesque-Byzantine icon of Madonna and Child (13th century) and artworks, among others, by Padovanino, Palma il Giovane, Savoldo, Parmigianino, Paris Bordone, and Titian.

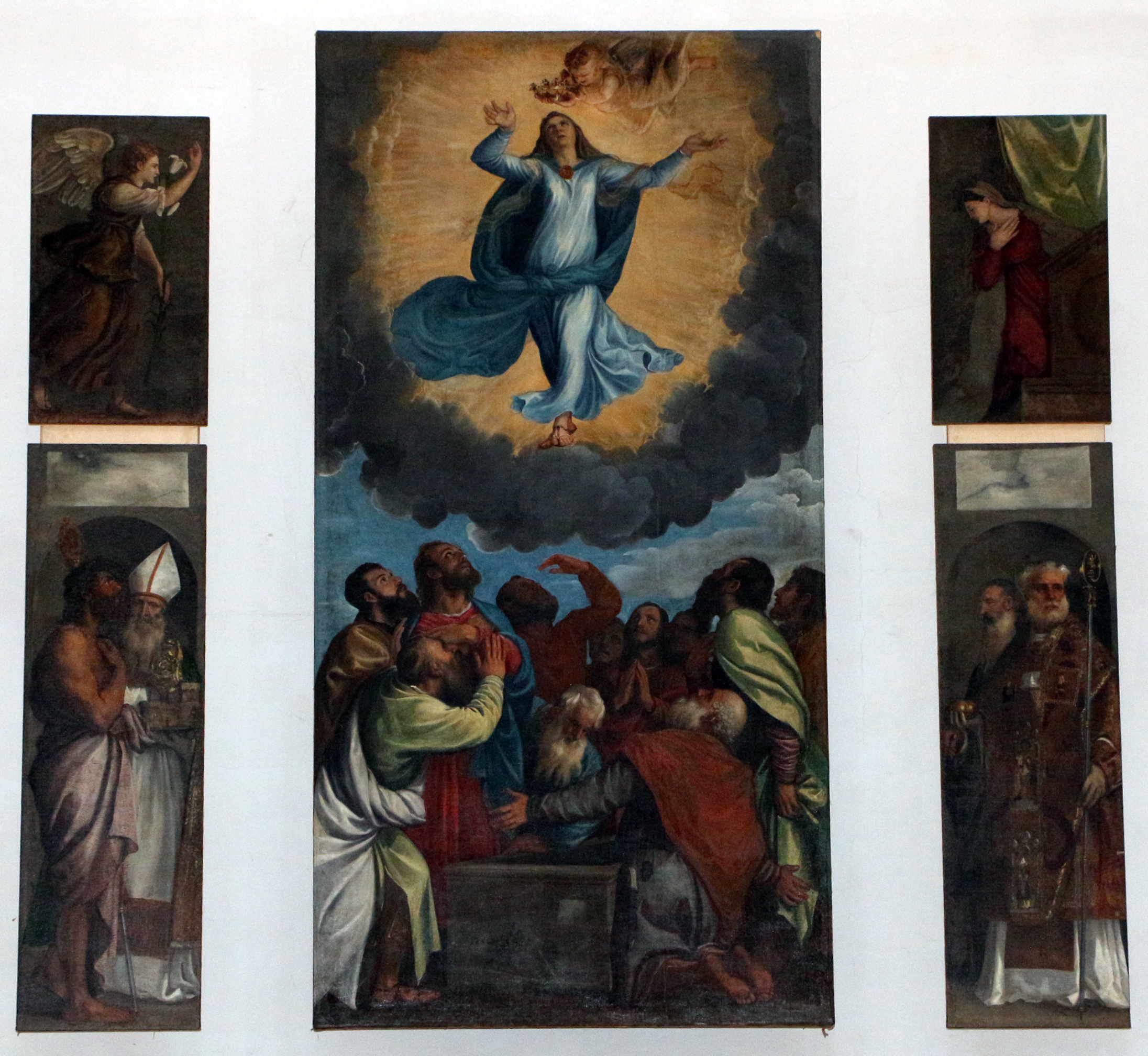
Triptych of "Assumption of Mary" above the altar by Titian (circa 1550)

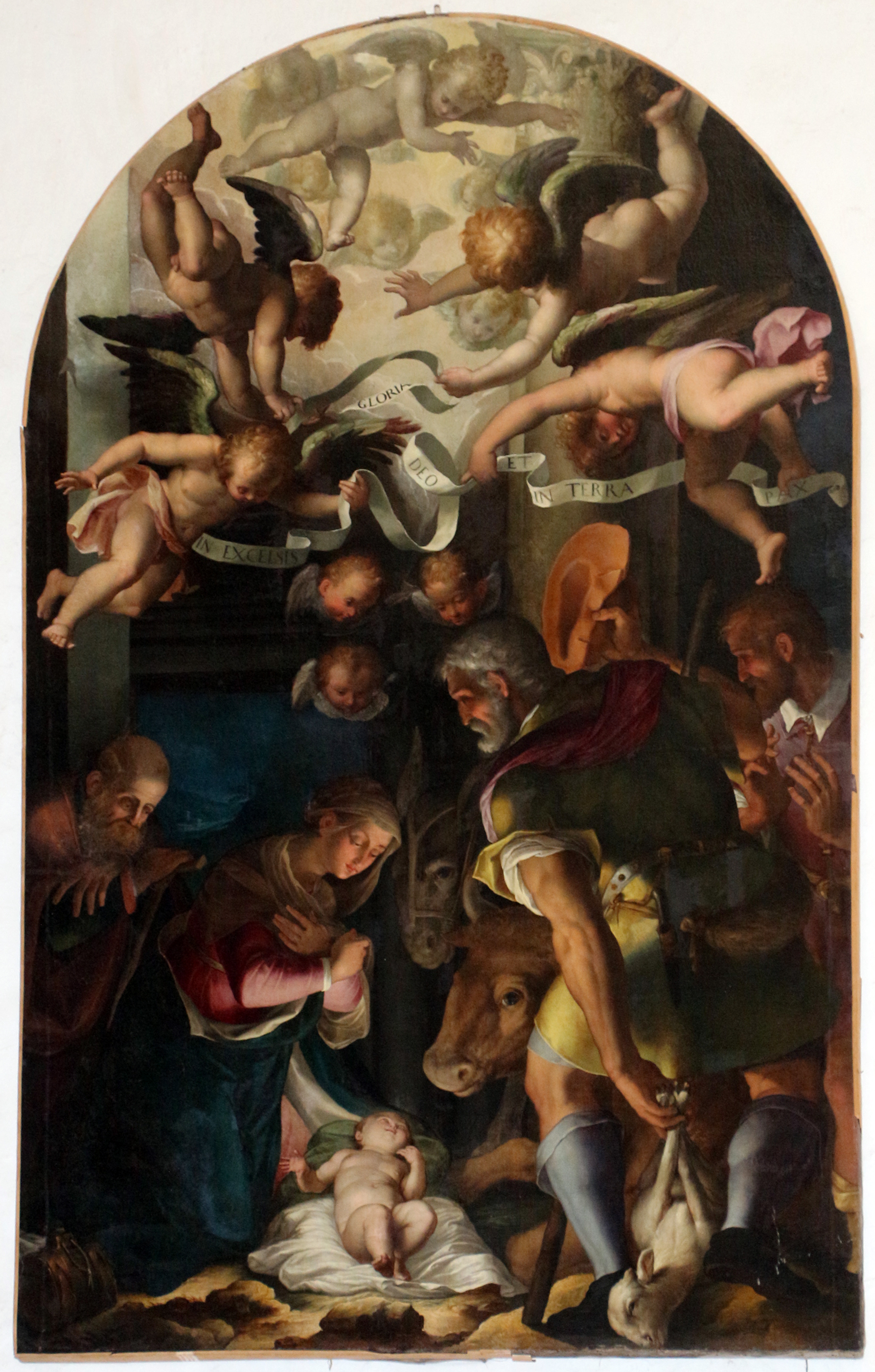
Adoration of the shepherds, Pellegrino Brocardo, 1568

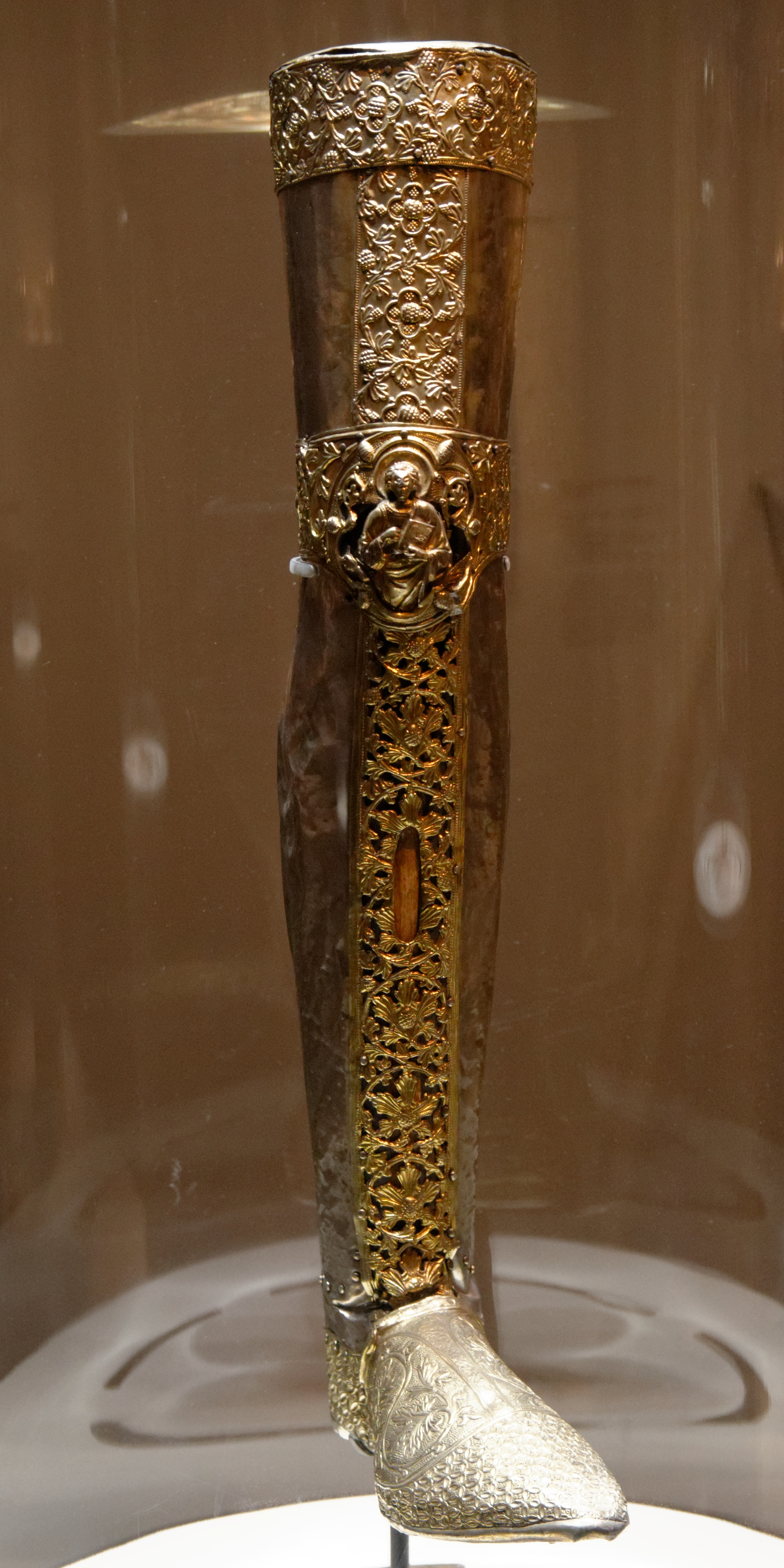
Reliquary of St. Nereus

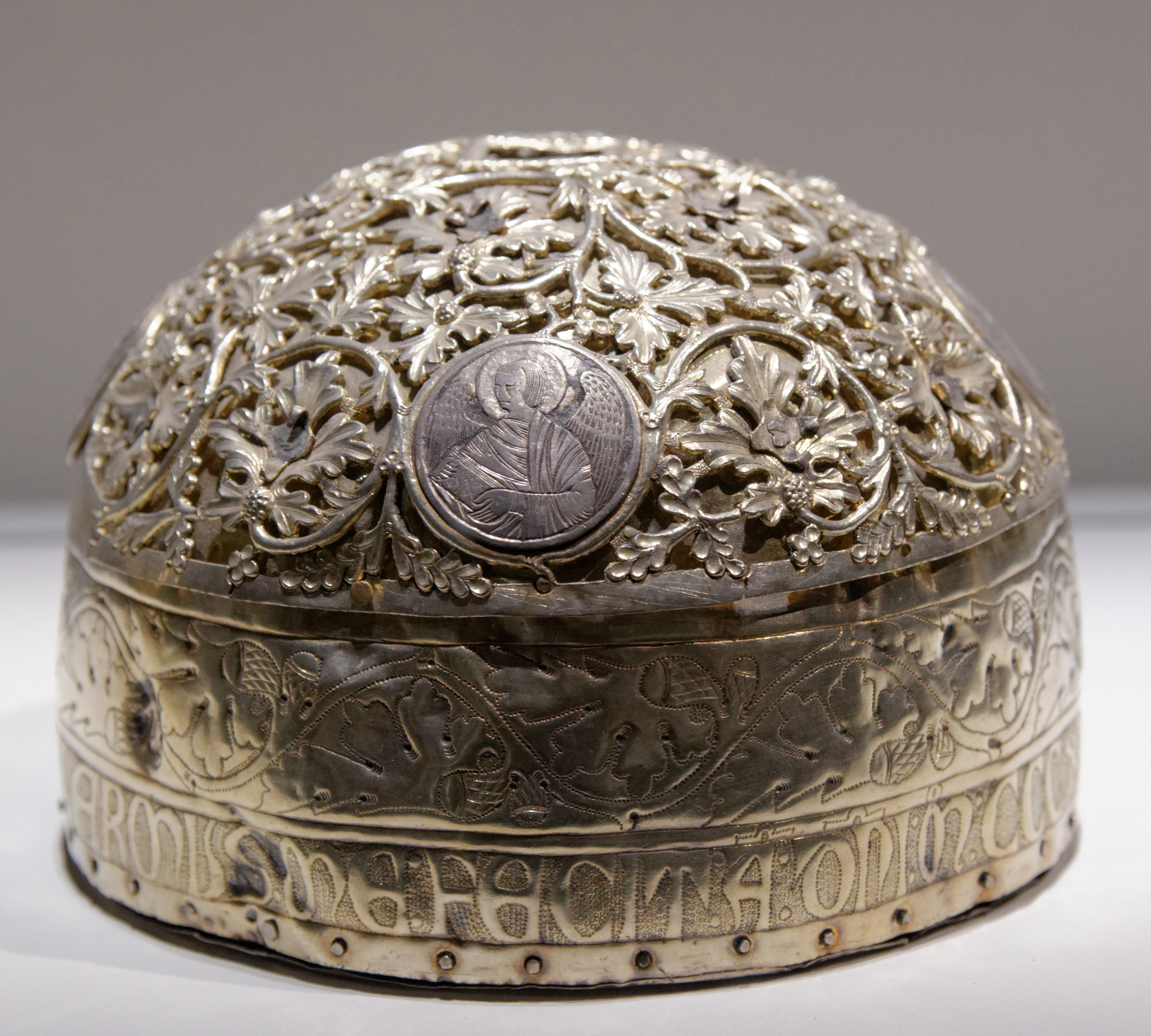
Reliquary of St. Lawrence

== Gallery ==
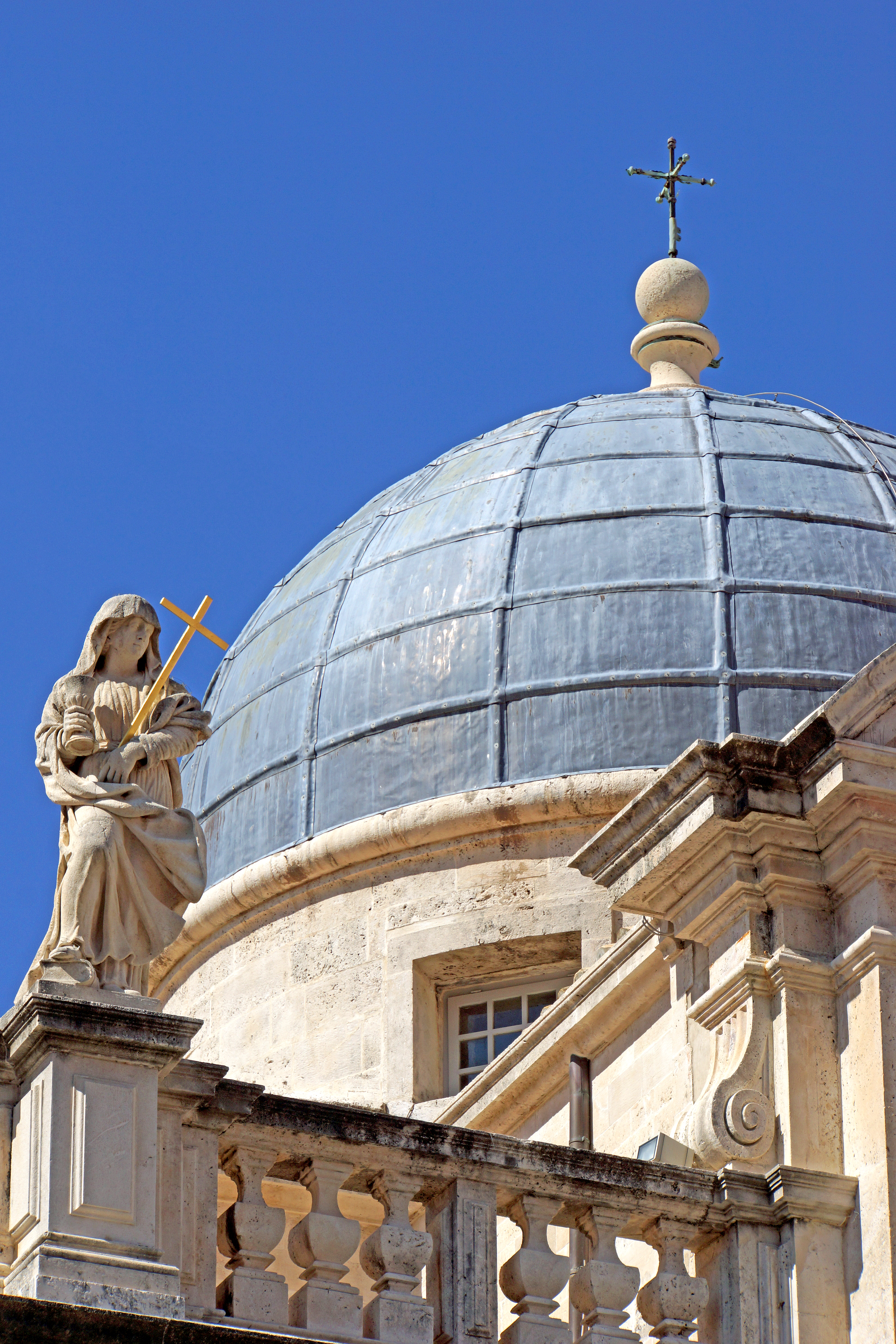
Cathedral's dome

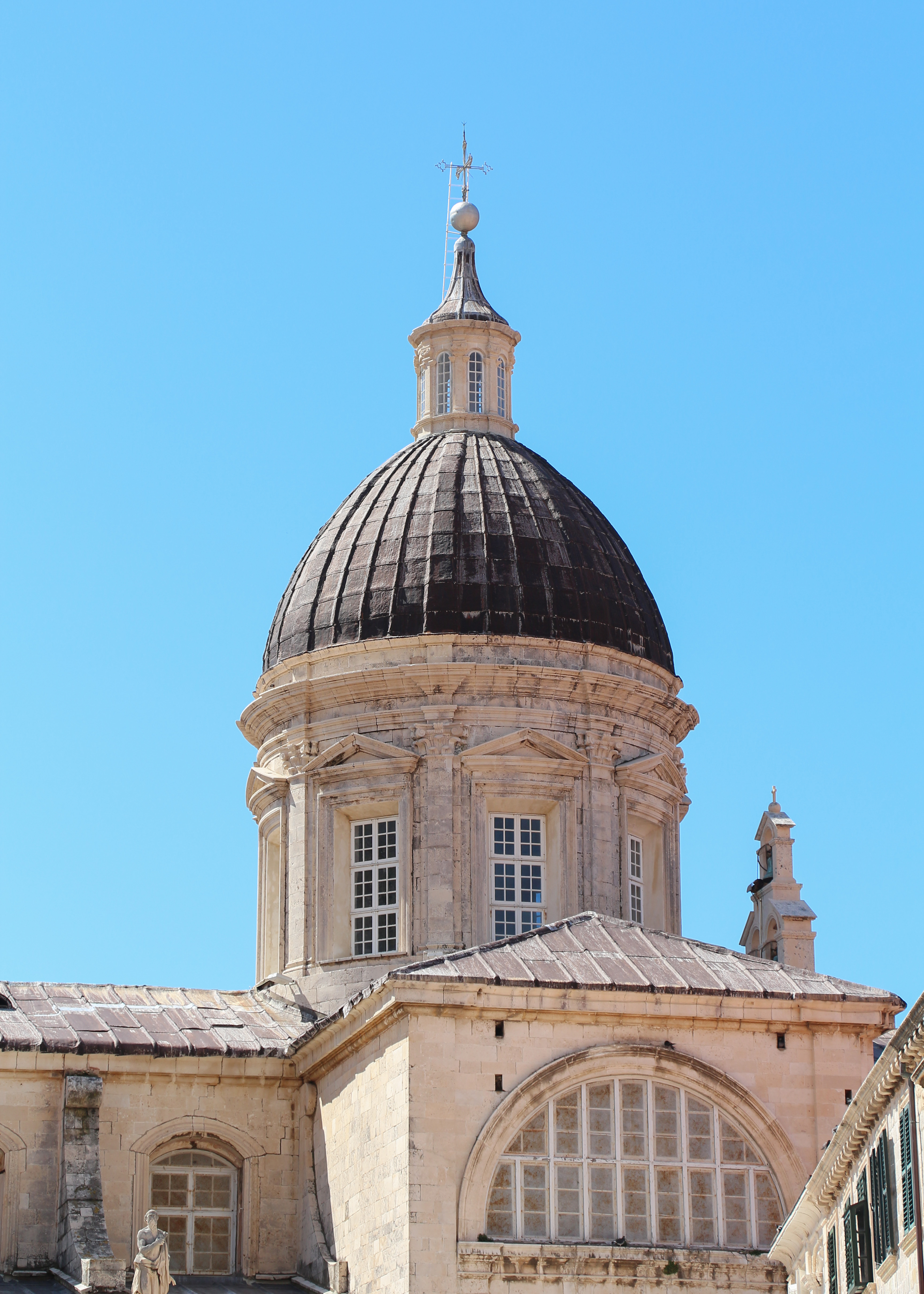
Dome of the cathedral

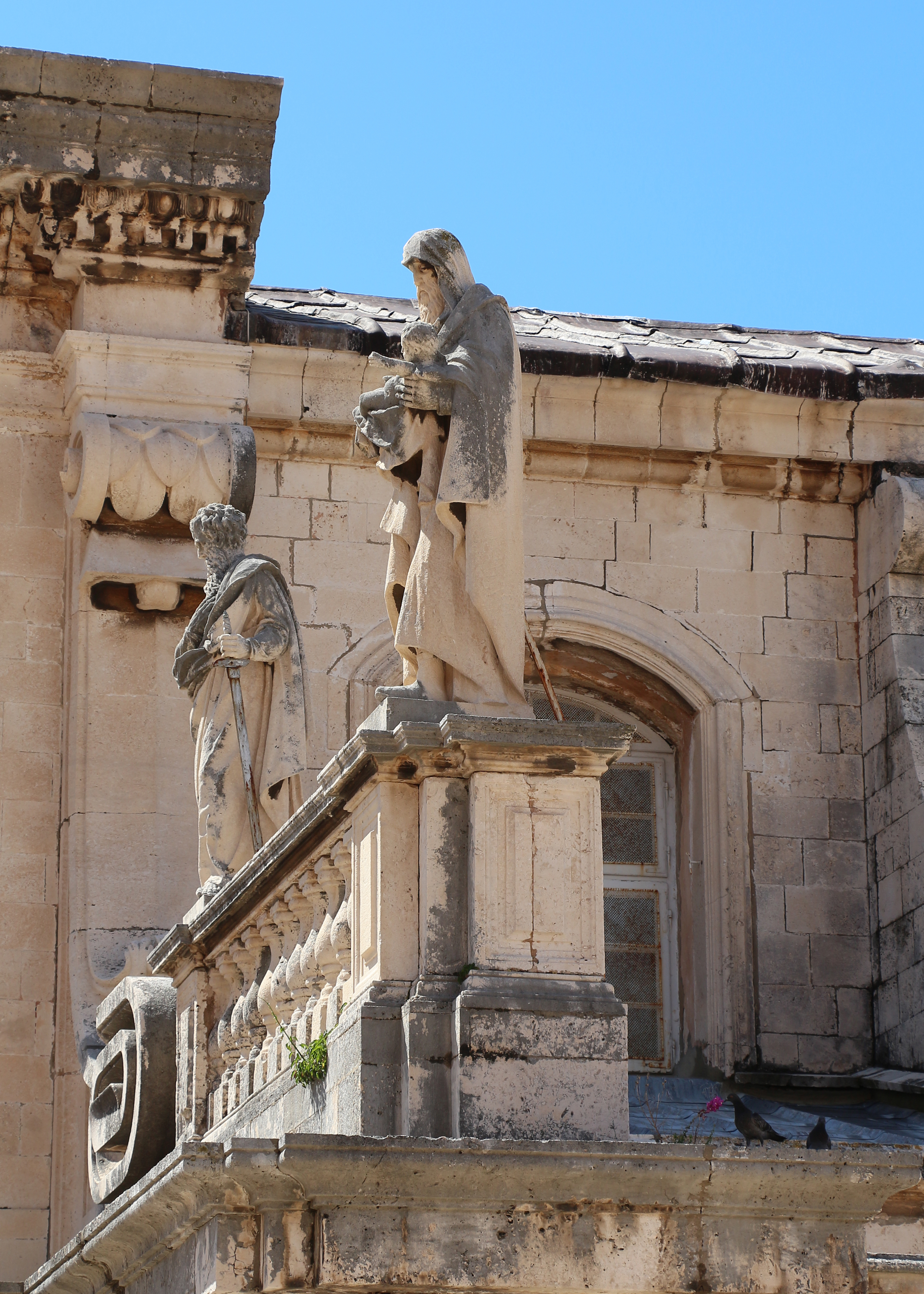
Statues on the cathedral

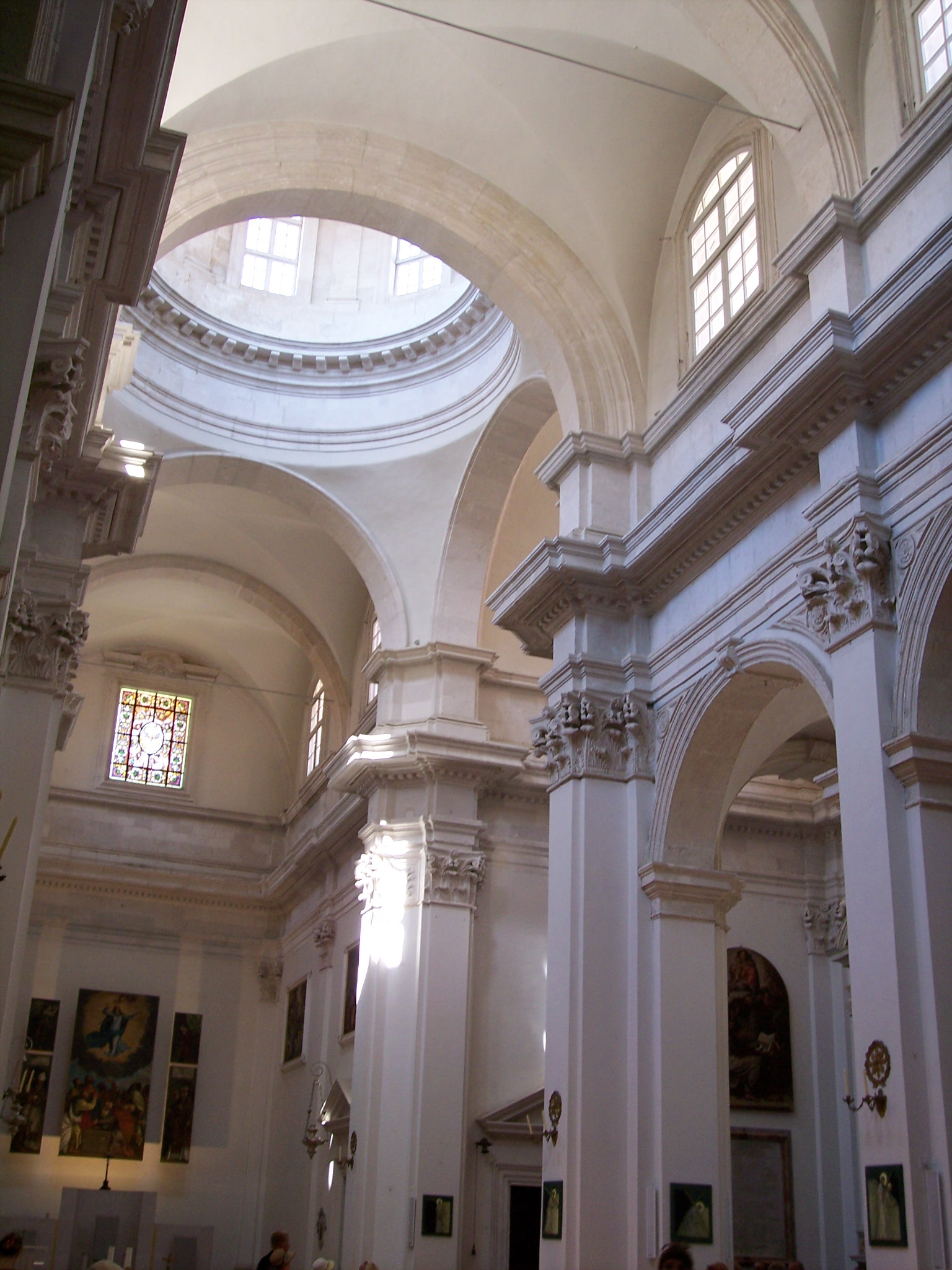
The interior

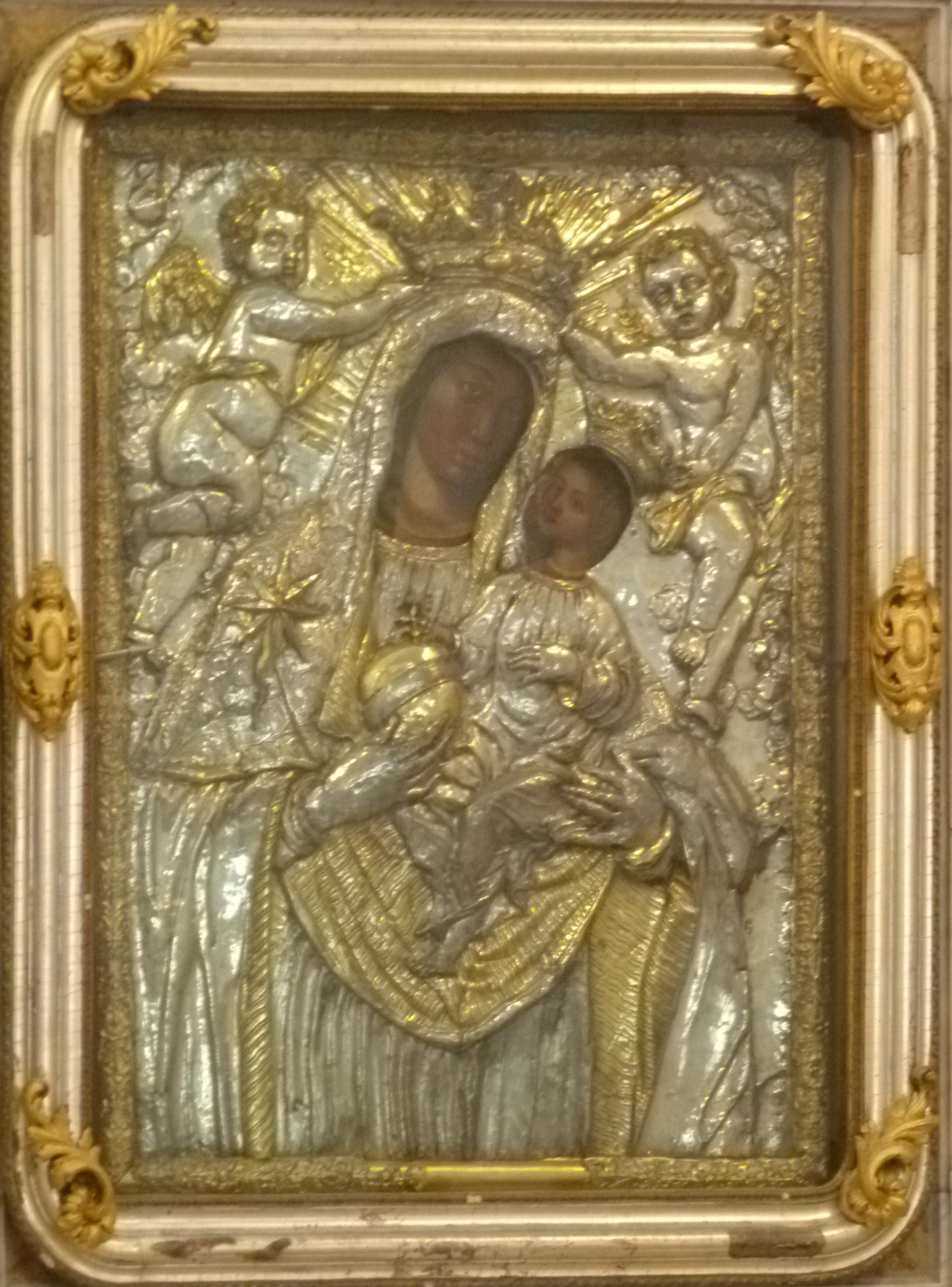
"Our Lady of the Harbor" with a painting of "Madonna and Child", framed by a silver relief

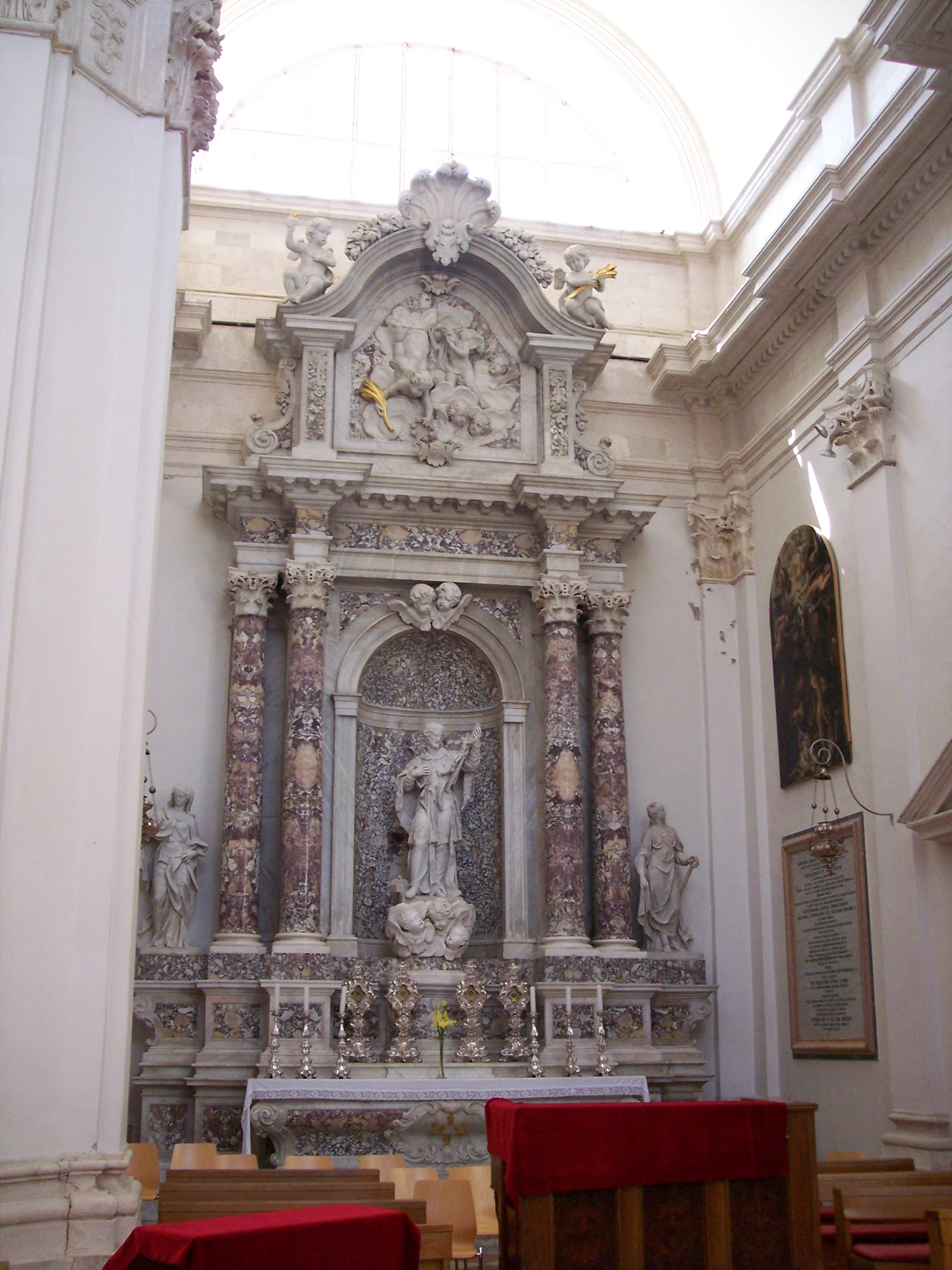
Altar of Saint John of Nepomuk

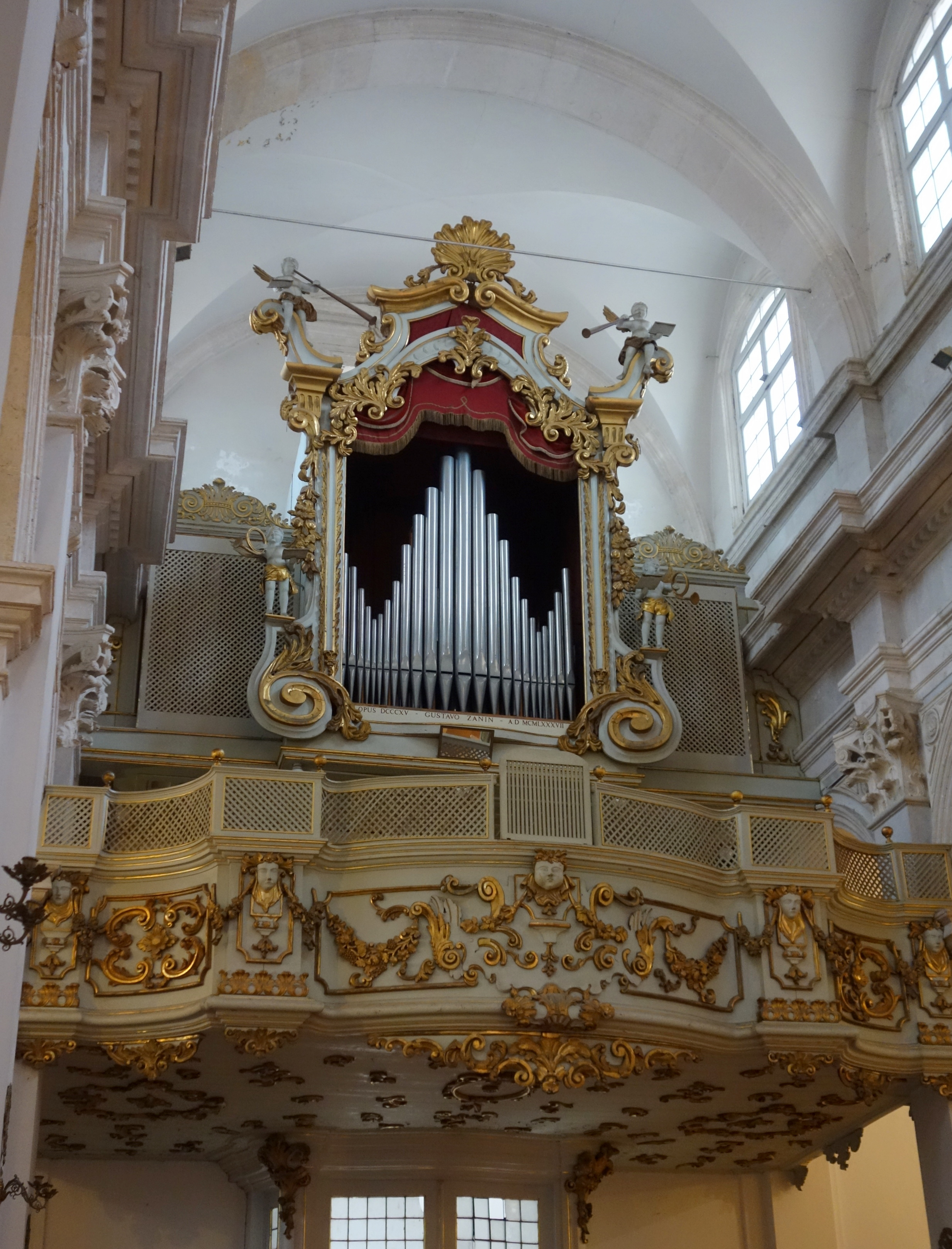
Organ

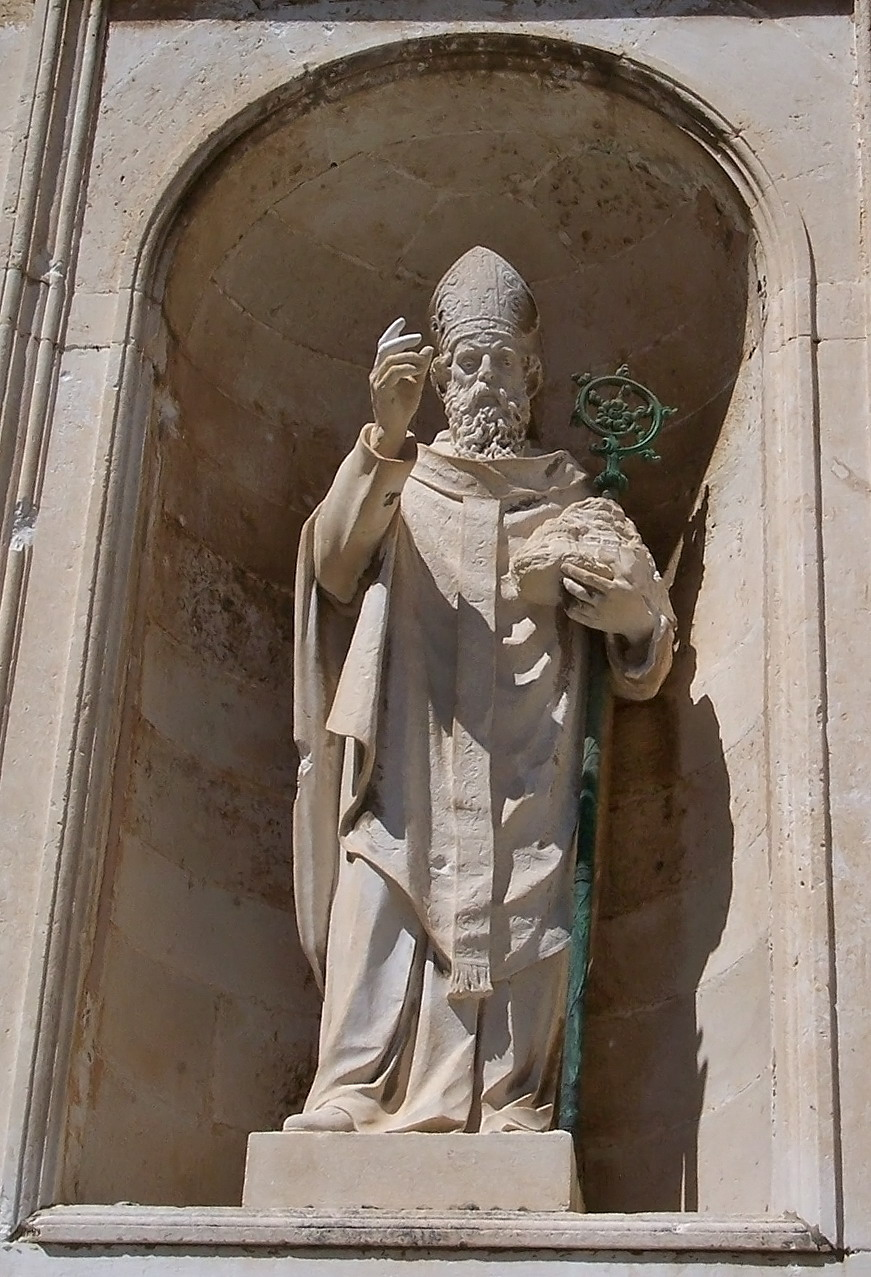
Statue of Saint Blaise on a niche

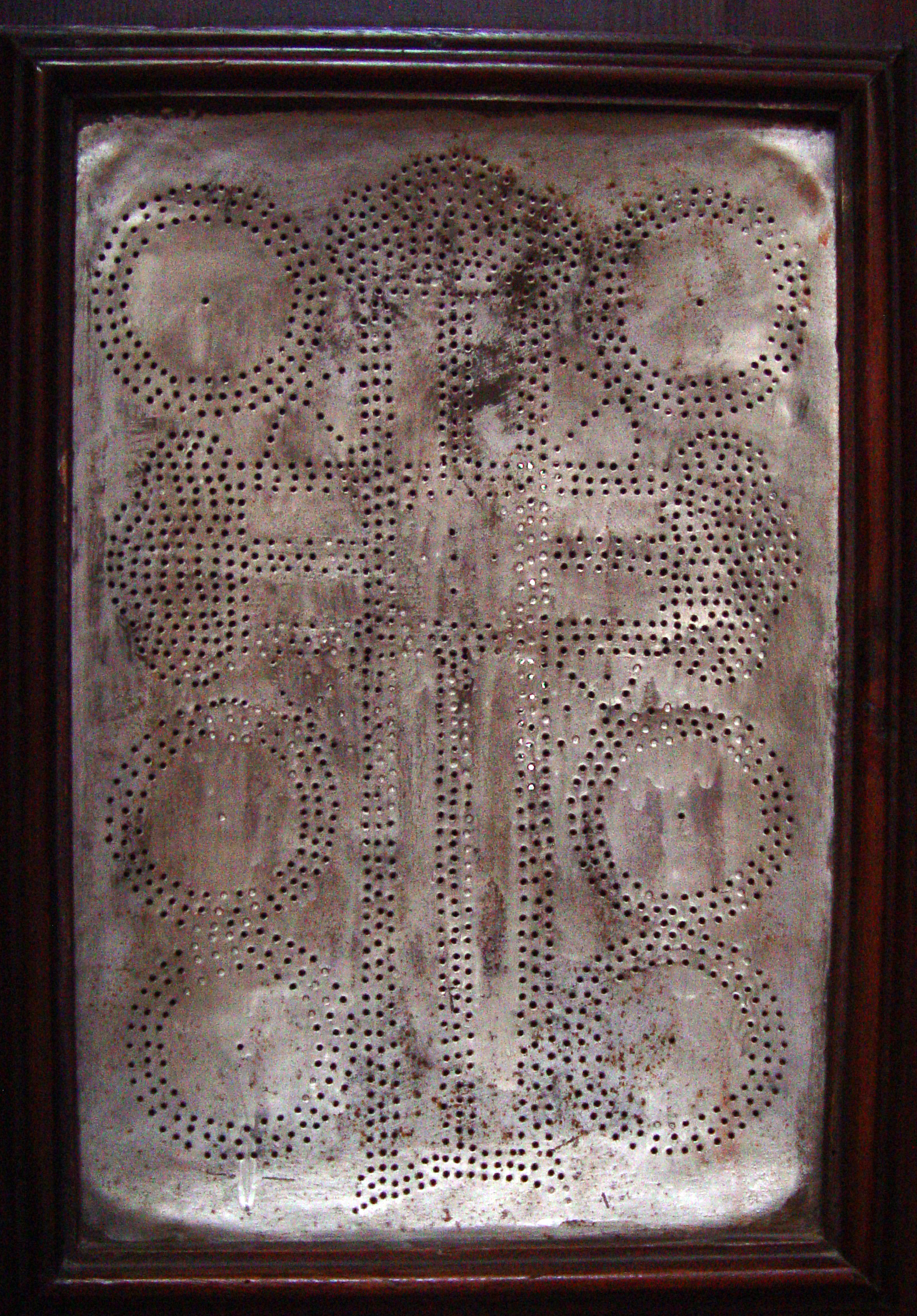
Metal confessional lattice in the Dubrovnik Cathedral

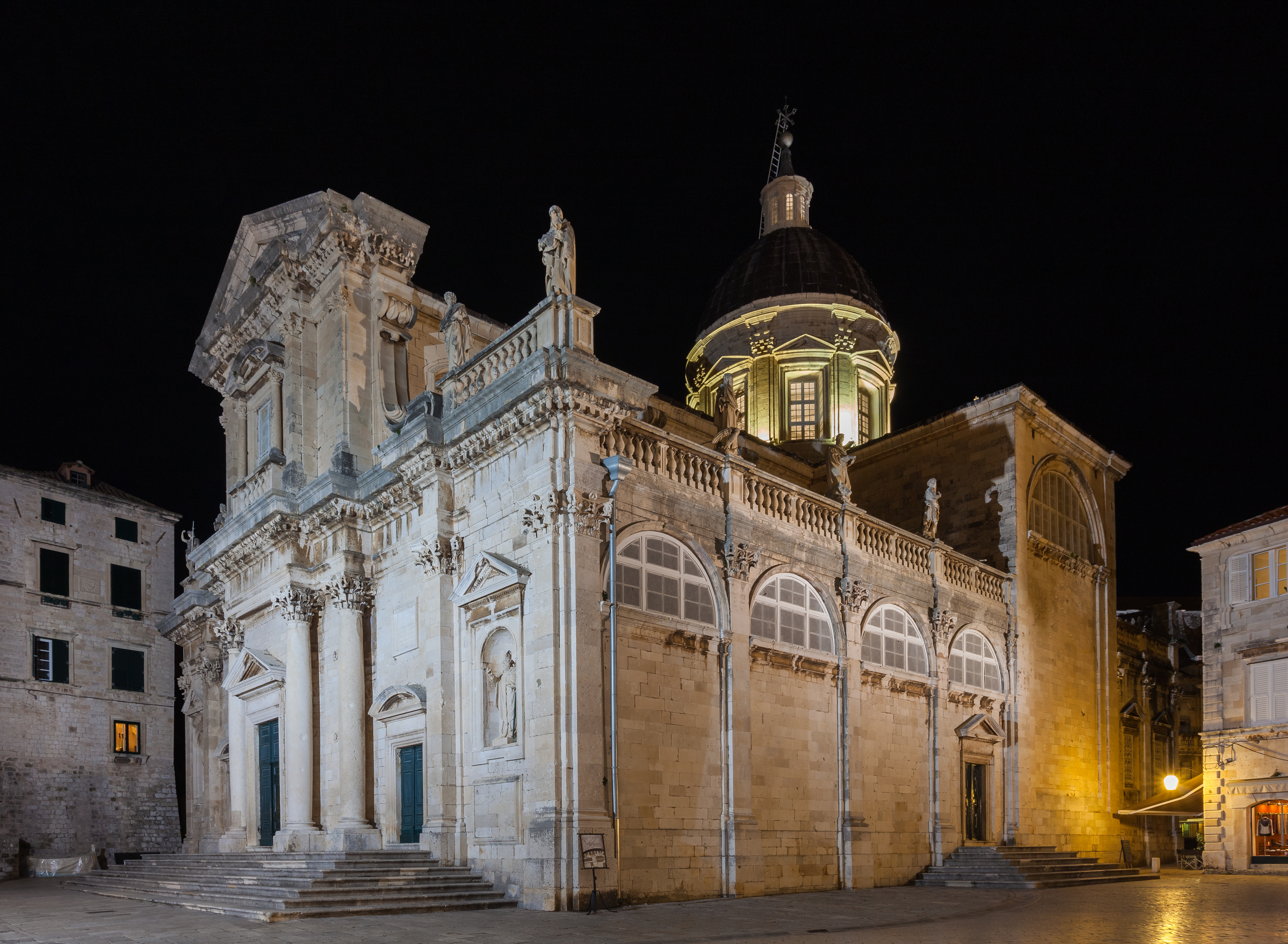
Night view

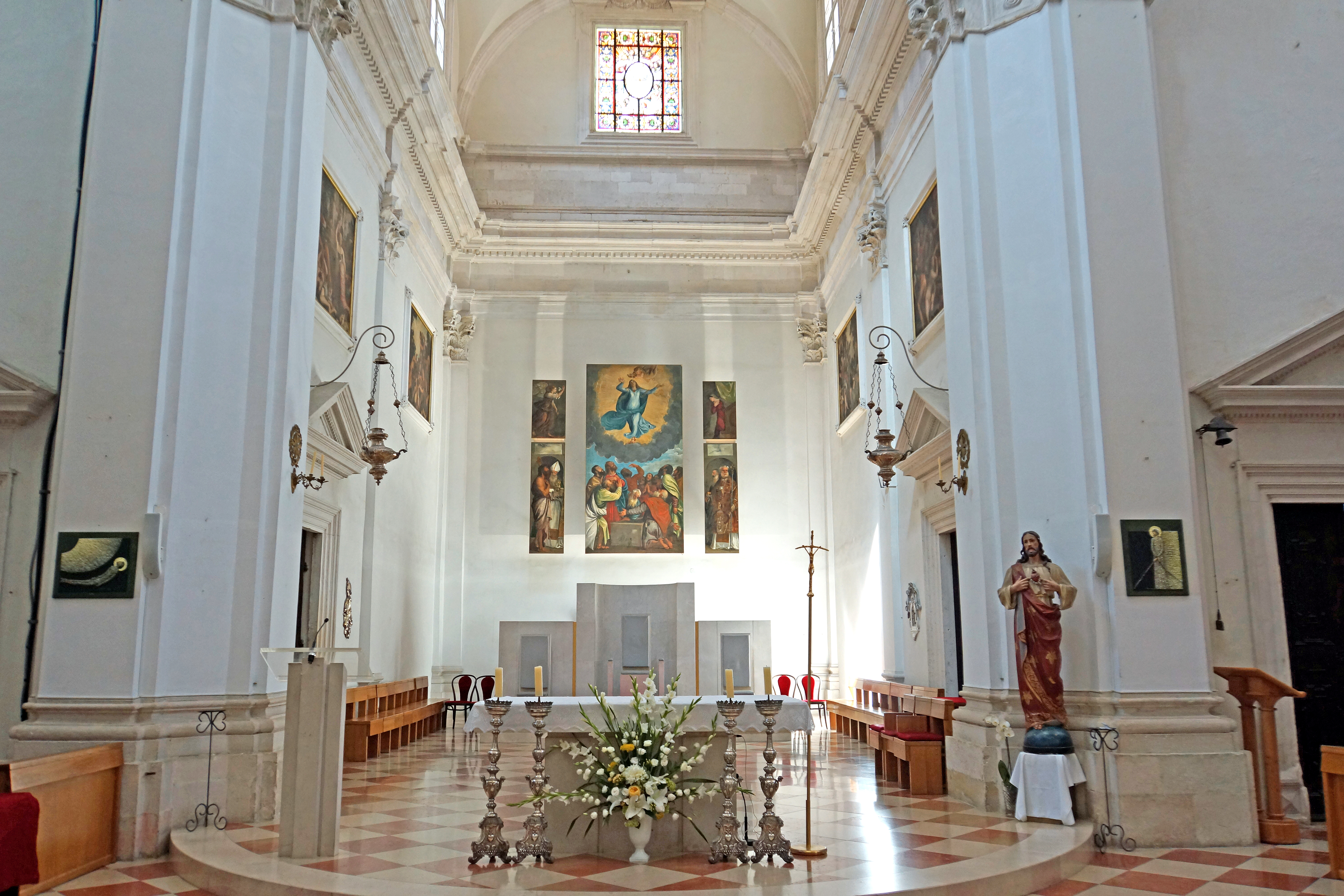
Main altar with Triptych of "Assumption of Mary" by Titian

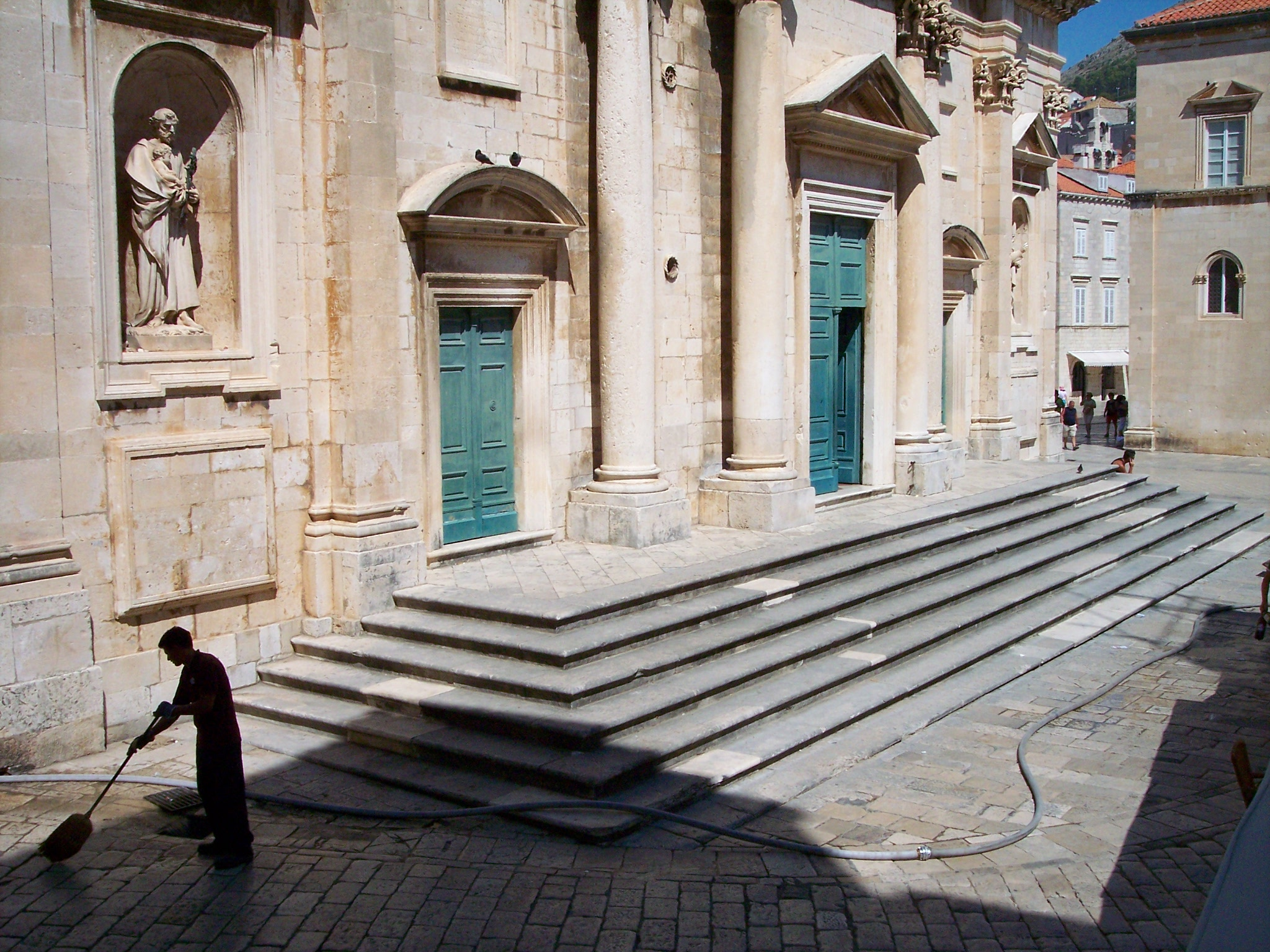
Portal and entrance

== See also ==
- List of cathedrals in Croatia
- 18th-century Western domes

== Sources ==
- Dubrovnik, history, culture, art heritage by Antun Travirka; Forum, Zadar, 2014; ISBN 978-953-179-884-6
- The Cathedral Treasury
- Vežić, Pavuša (2014). "Ikonografija romaničke katedrale u Dubrovniku". Ars Adriatica (in Croatian) (4): 63–74.
