= Dubrovnik Bell Tower =

Clock tower in Dubrovnik, Croatia

- Gradski zvonik
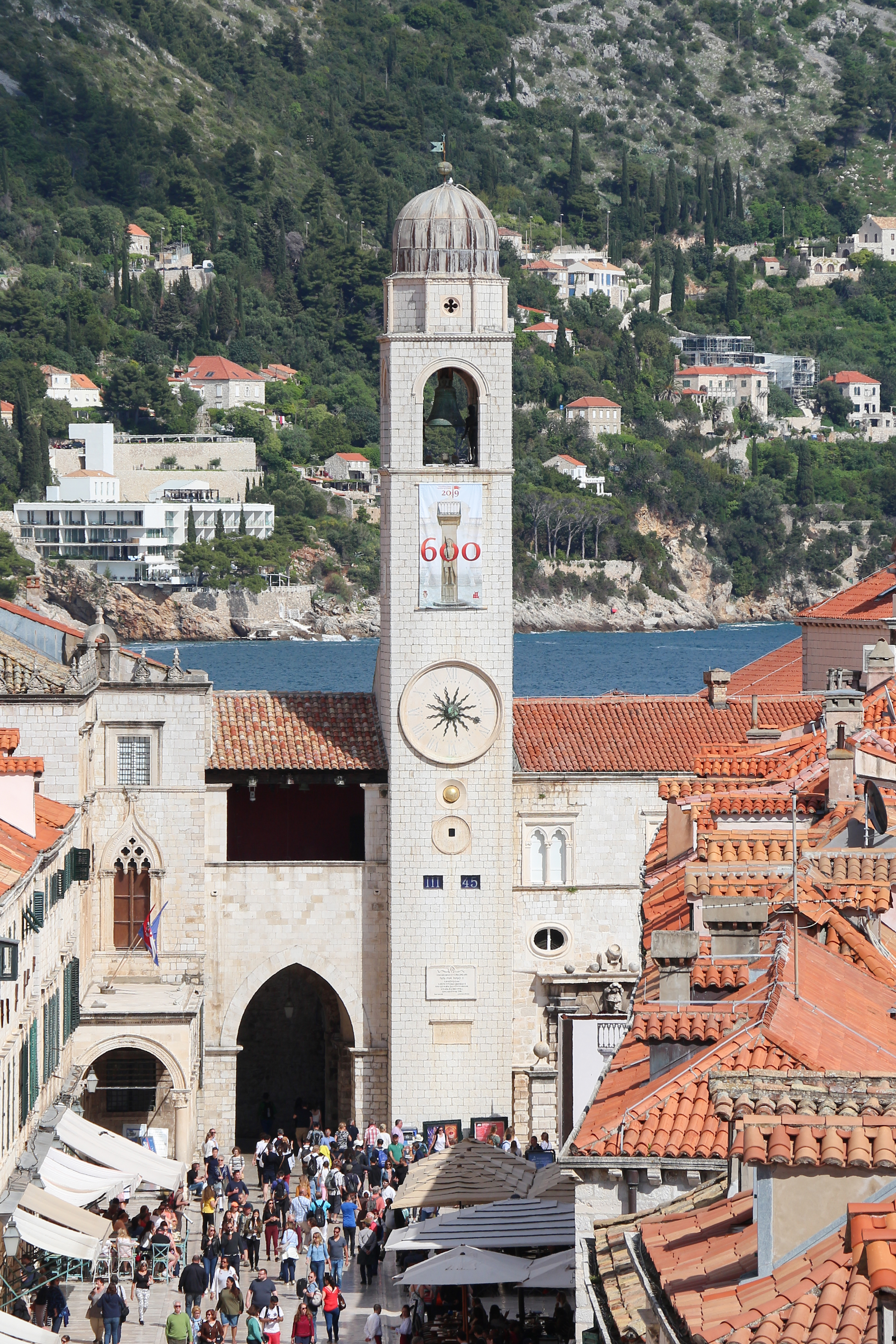
- Dubrovnik Bell Tower on Luža Square
- Interactive map of the Dubrovnik Bell Tower area

General information
- Location: Dubrovnik, Croatia, Luža Square
- Coordinates: 42°38′27″N 18°06′38″E
- Completed: 1444

Height
- Height: 31 m (102 ft)

Technical details
- Material: Stone

The Dubrovnik Bell Tower (Croatian: Gradski zvonik) is a tower in Dubrovnik, Croatia. Located on Luža Square at the end of the Stradun, the tower is 31 metres high.

== History ==
Originally constructed in 1444, the tower suffered damage in the 1667 Dubrovnik earthquake among other earthquakes and, having started to lean towards the Stradun in the early 19th century, it was demolished in 1928 and entirely rebuilt to the original design in 1929. It was damaged again in the 1979 Montenegro earthquake, and restored in 1987–1988. The bronze bell which strikes the hours was cast in 1506 by Ivan Rabljanin.

The two bronze jacquemarts which strike the bell are known as Maro and Baro, or the Zelenci (green ones), due to their green patina. The present Zelenci are replicas installed in the rebuilt tower in 1929. The original Zelenci of circa 1478 are now exhibited in the Cultural History Museum in the Rector's Palace.
