= St. Saviour Church, Dubrovnik =

Church in Dubrovnik

St. Saviour Church (Croatian: Crkva sv. Spasa)
- View of the church with tourists in Stradun
- St. Saviour Church (Croatian: Crkva sv. Spasa)
- 42°38′30″N 18°6′25″E
- Location: Dubrovnik
- Country: Croatia
- Denomination: Roman Catholic

History
- Status: votive church
- Dedication: Jesus Christ

Architecture
- Functional status: Active
- Designated: 1520
- Architect: Petar Andrijich
- Architectural type: one-nave
- Style: Renaissance with some Gothic features
- Completed: 1528

St. Saviour Church (Croatian: Crkva sv. Spasa; Italian: Chiesa di San Salvatore) is a small votive church located on Stradun in Dubrovnik's Old Town. It is dedicated to Jesus Christ.

== History and architecture ==
Following an earthquake on 17 May 1520, which killed about 20 people and damaged many buildings in the city, the local Senate which governed Dubrovnik Republic commissioned a new church as a sign of gratitude for sparing the city from even bigger destruction. The monumental inscription above the main entrance on the front facade testifies to this. Designed by the architect Petar Andrijić from Korčula, construction started in 1520 and the church was completed in 1528.

The church has one nave with a Gothic-cross-ribbed vault. The lateral windows are also Gothic with the typical pointed arches. Nevertheless, the main facade with the Renaissance elements on the portal and the three-leaf semicircular top as well as the semicircular apse reveal a recognizable Renaissance style.

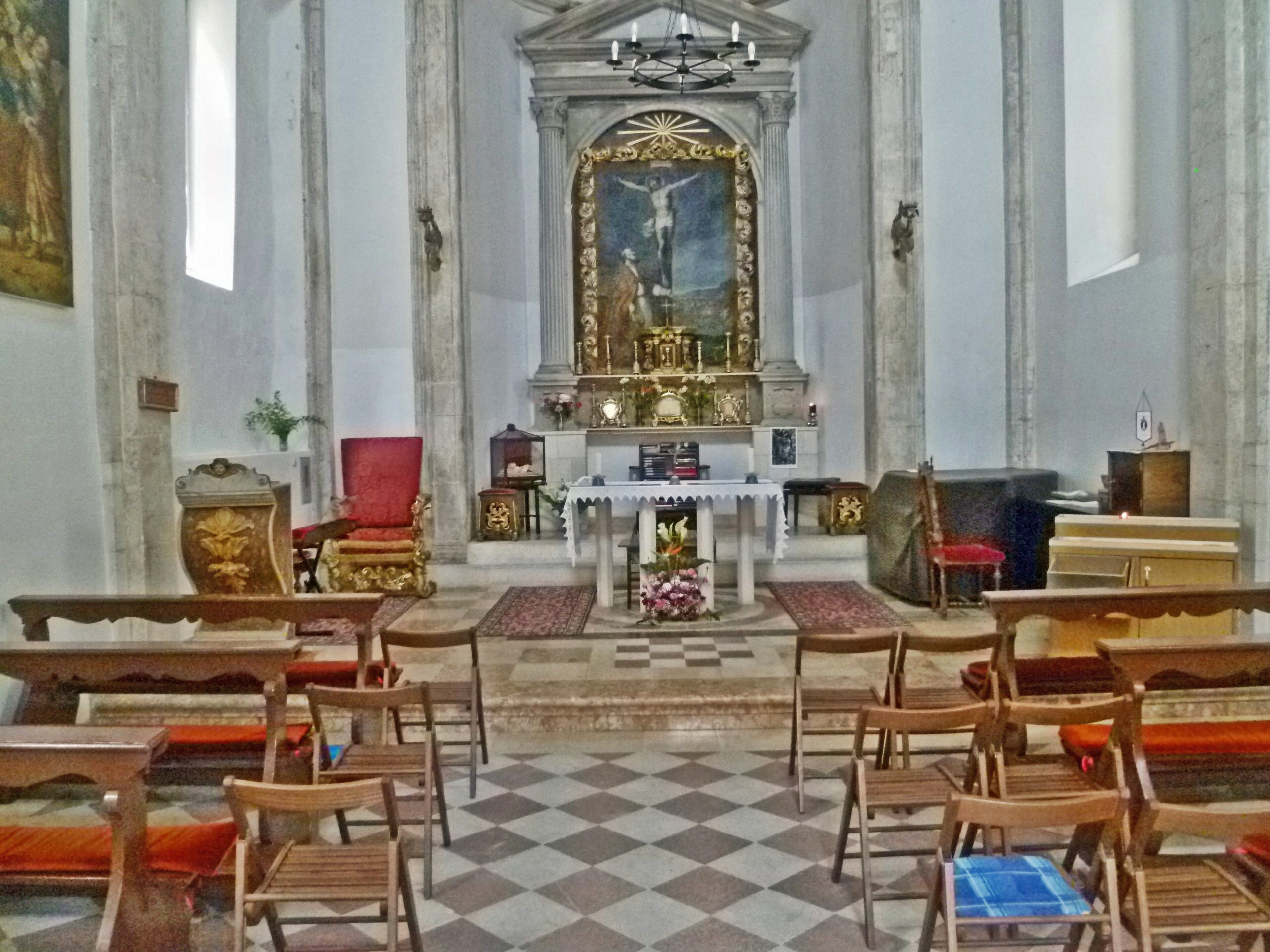
Interior of the St. Saviour Church

In 1667 Dubrovnik was hit again by a disastrous earthquake which killed some 5,000 citizens and destroyed much of the city. However, St. Saviour Church withstood the disaster so it can be seen today in its original form, as a fine example of the town's Renaissance architecture.
