= Ivan Rabljanin =

Croatian artist and architect (died 1540)

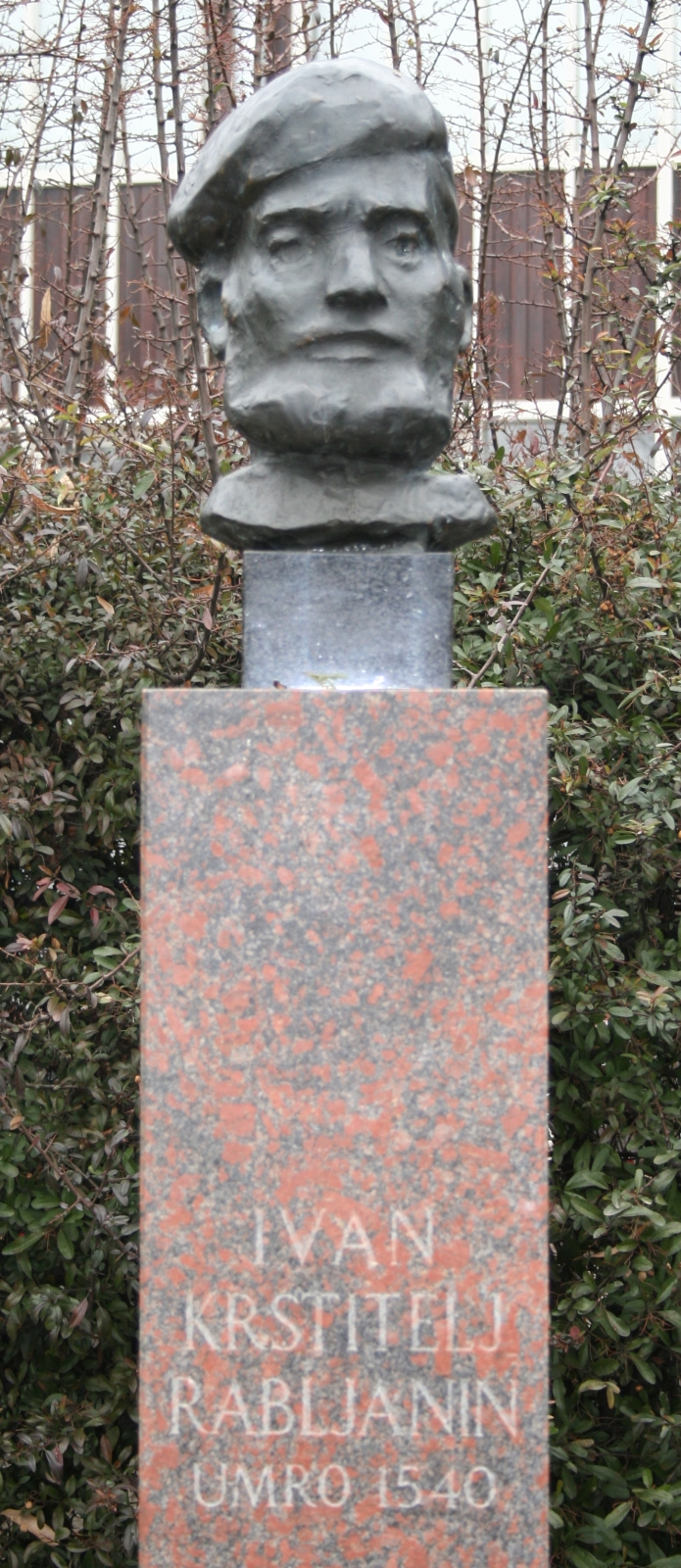
Rabljanin's bust in the Technical Museum, Zagreb

Ivan Krstitelj Rabljanin (Italian: Johannes Baptista Arbensis de la Tolle) (c. 1470–1540) was a cannon and bell founder in bronze; born in Rab, most of his works are in Dubrovnik.

He made cannons for Italy, Spain and Republic of Dubrovnik. In 1506 he forged a bell that still hangs today, in Dubrovnik Bell Tower. His most beautiful cannon was built in 1537 named 'lizzard', on the tower Lovrijenac.

== Sources ==
- Ivan Krstitelj Rabljanin (in Croatian)
