= Stradun (street) =

Main street of Dubrovnik, Croatia

- Placa
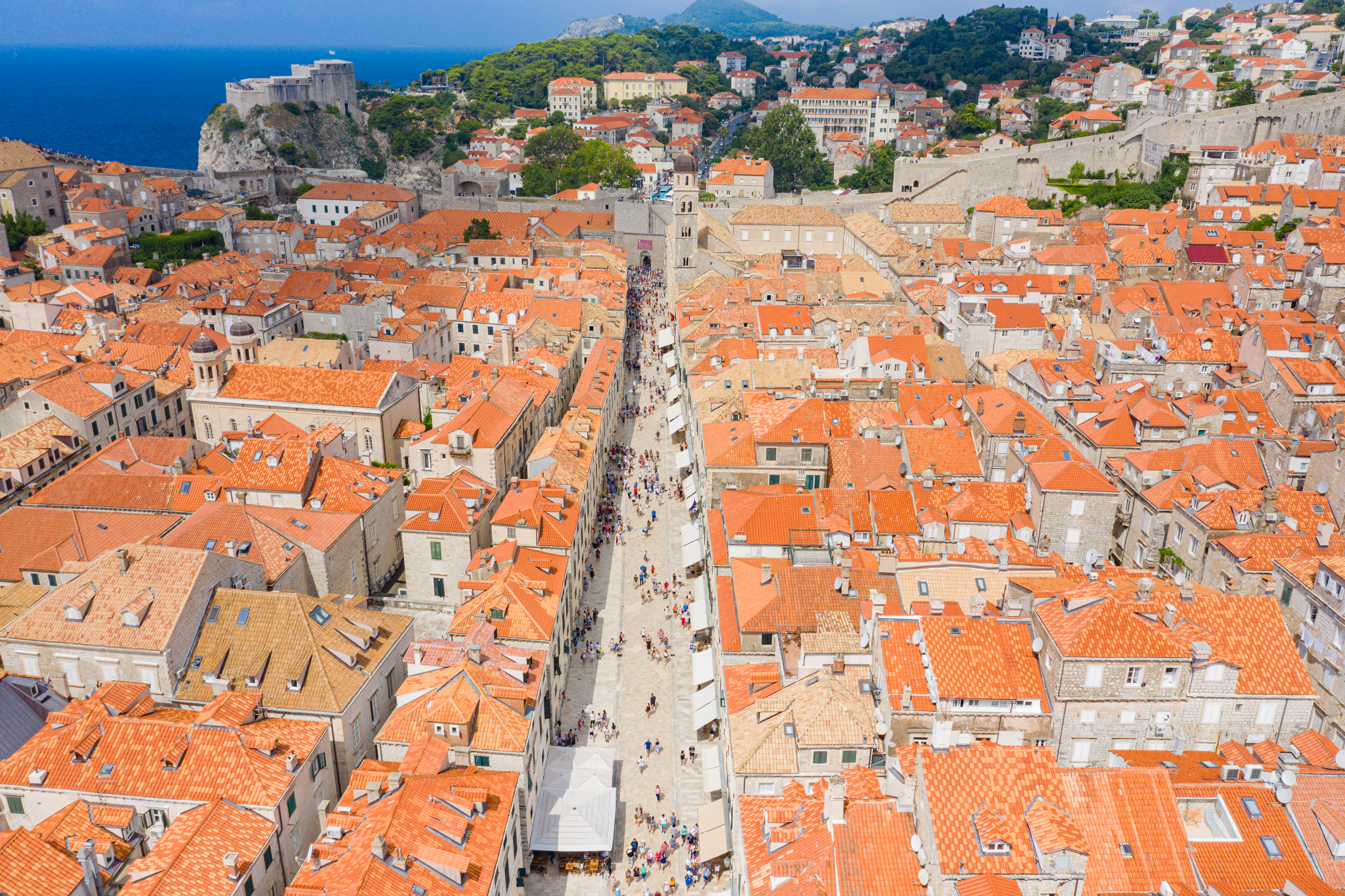
- Stradun during summer
- Interactive map of Stradun
- Length: 300 m (980 ft)
- Location: Dubrovnik
- Coordinates: 42°38′29″N 18°06′29″E

Construction
- Completion: 1468

Stradun (pronounced [strǎduːn]) or Placa (Stradone or Corso), whose name derives from Venetian, and means "large road" or "wide road", is the main street of Dubrovnik, Croatia. The limestone-paved pedestrian street runs some 300 metres through the Old Town, the historic part of the city surrounded by the Walls of Dubrovnik.

The site of the present-day street used to be a marshy channel which separated Ragusa from the forest settlement of Dubrava before it was reclaimed in the 13th century. Stradun stretches through the walled town in the east–west direction, connecting the western entrance called the "Pile Gate" (Vrata od Pila) to the "Ploče Gate" (Vrata od Ploča) on the eastern end. Both ends are also marked with 15th-century fountains (the so-called Large Onofrio's Fountain in the western section and the Small Onofrio's Fountain on the east end) and bell towers (the Dubrovnik Bell Tower on the east end and the bell tower attached to the Franciscan monastery to the west).

Stradun became the city's main thoroughfare in the 13th century, and its current appearance was for the most part created following the devastating 1667 earthquake in which most of the buildings in Ragusa (as Dubrovnik was then called) were destroyed. Before the earthquake the houses which line the street were not so uniformly designed as they appear today, with many of them featuring arcades and elaborate decorations. Following the 1667 earthquake and a large fire which broke out immediately afterwards, the Republic of Ragusa passed a law which specified the layout of all future residential buildings constructed in the city.

Because of this all of the 17th-century houses lining the Stradun share the same pattern - the ground level always housed a shop with a street entrance featuring a door and a window in a single frame under a semicircular arch (during the day the door would be kept closed and goods would be handed to customers over the sill, thereby serving as a counter), and a storage room in the back with a separate alley entrance. The first floor above ground level was reserved for the living area and the second floor had various rooms, while the kitchen was invariably located in the loft above the second floor, to prevent the spread of potential fires.

In recent times, the Stradun and some of the surrounding houses were damaged in mortar shelling during the Siege of Dubrovnik in 1991–92, but most of the damage has since been repaired.

Many of the historic buildings and monuments in Dubrovnik are situated along the Stradun, because of which it serves as a popular esplanade for tourists. A procession for the Feast of Saint Blaise, the patron saint of Dubrovnik, passes through Stradun every year on 3 February. Occasional concerts are also held at Stradun and it is regularly used as the site of New Year's Eve celebrations.

On 8 July 2010 Stradun was also site of a fund-raising exhibition tennis match played by Goran Ivanišević and John McEnroe in front of an audience of 600 and televised live in 10 countries.

== Gallery ==
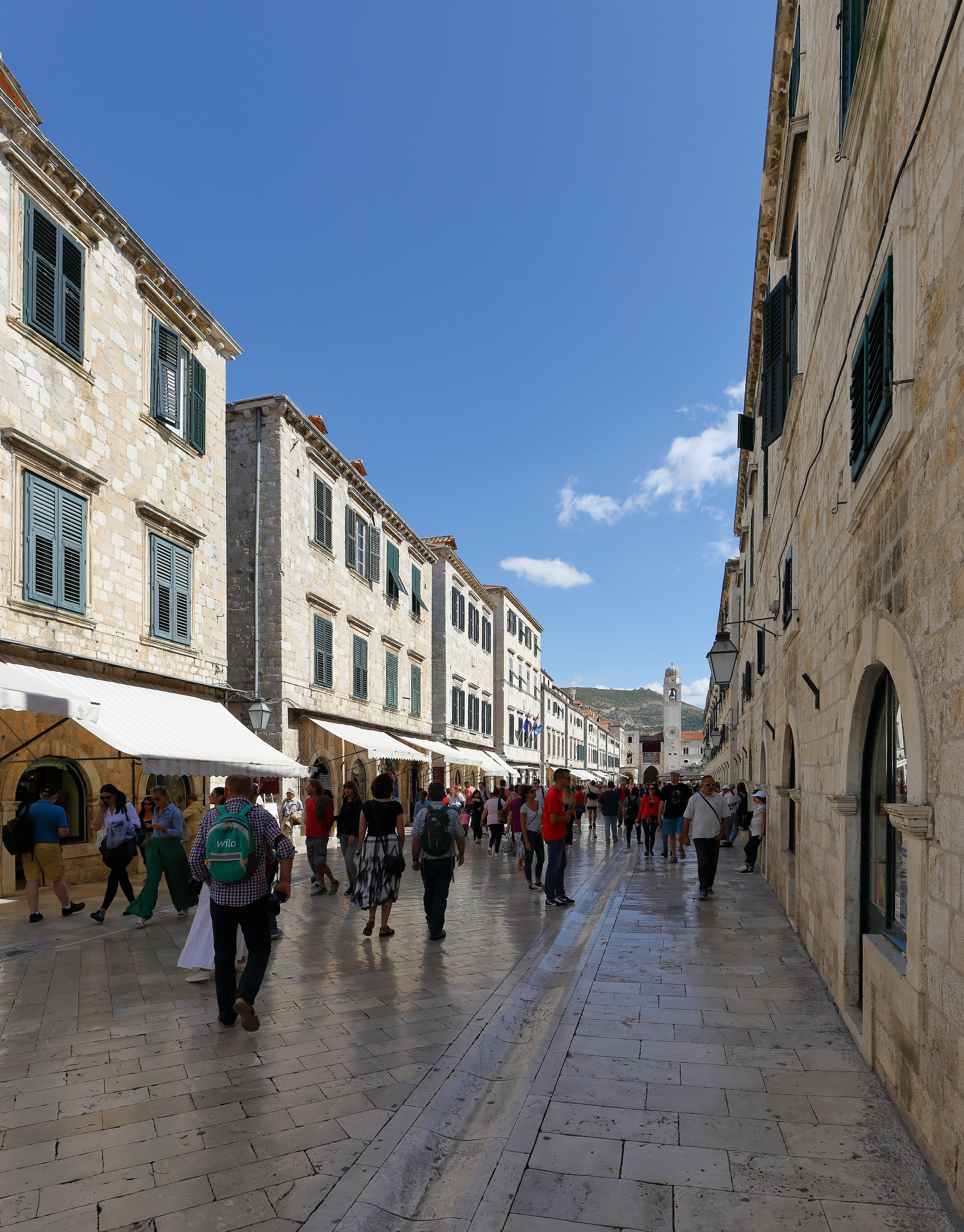
Stradun bustling during main season.

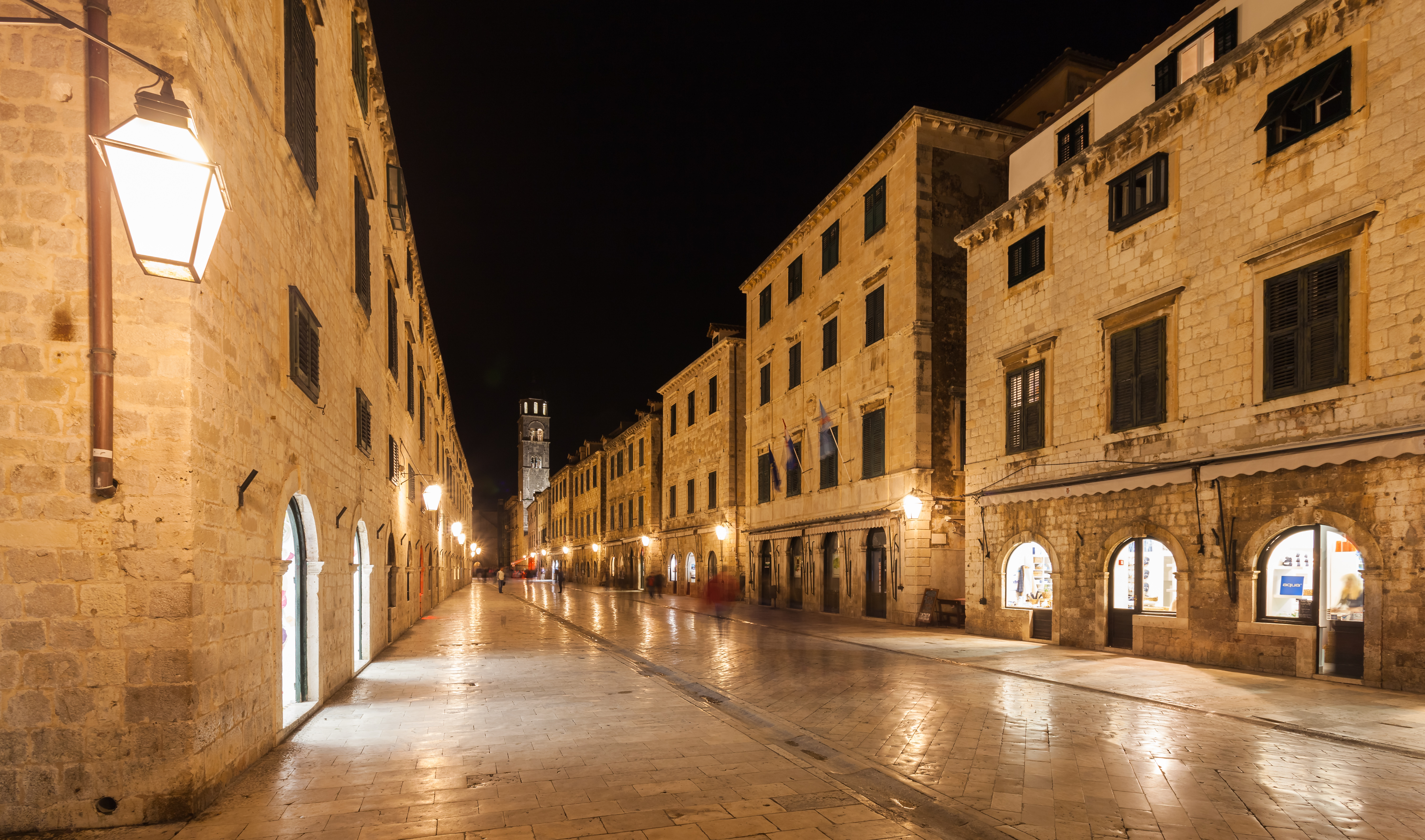
Stradun by night.

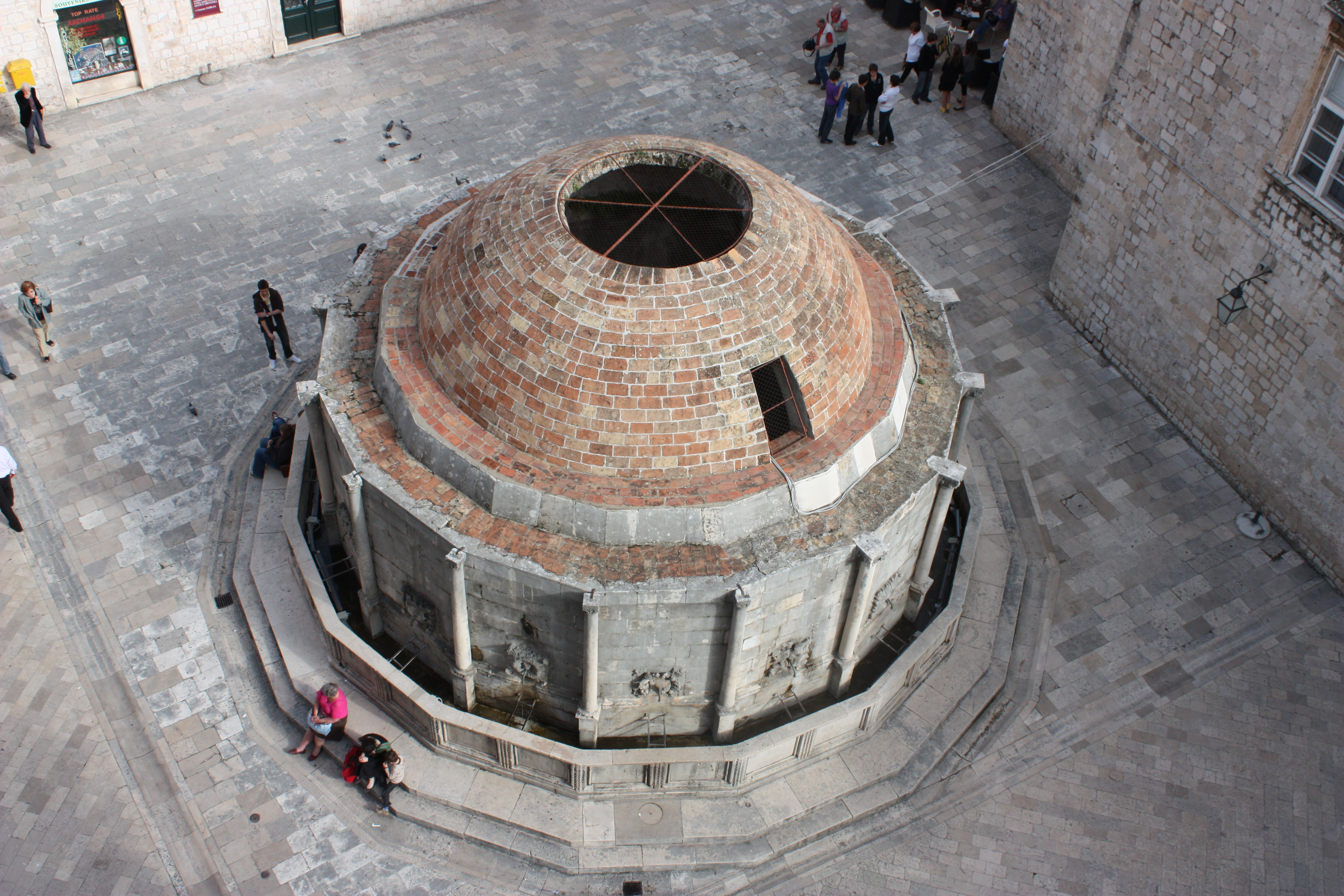
The Large Onofrio's Fountain.

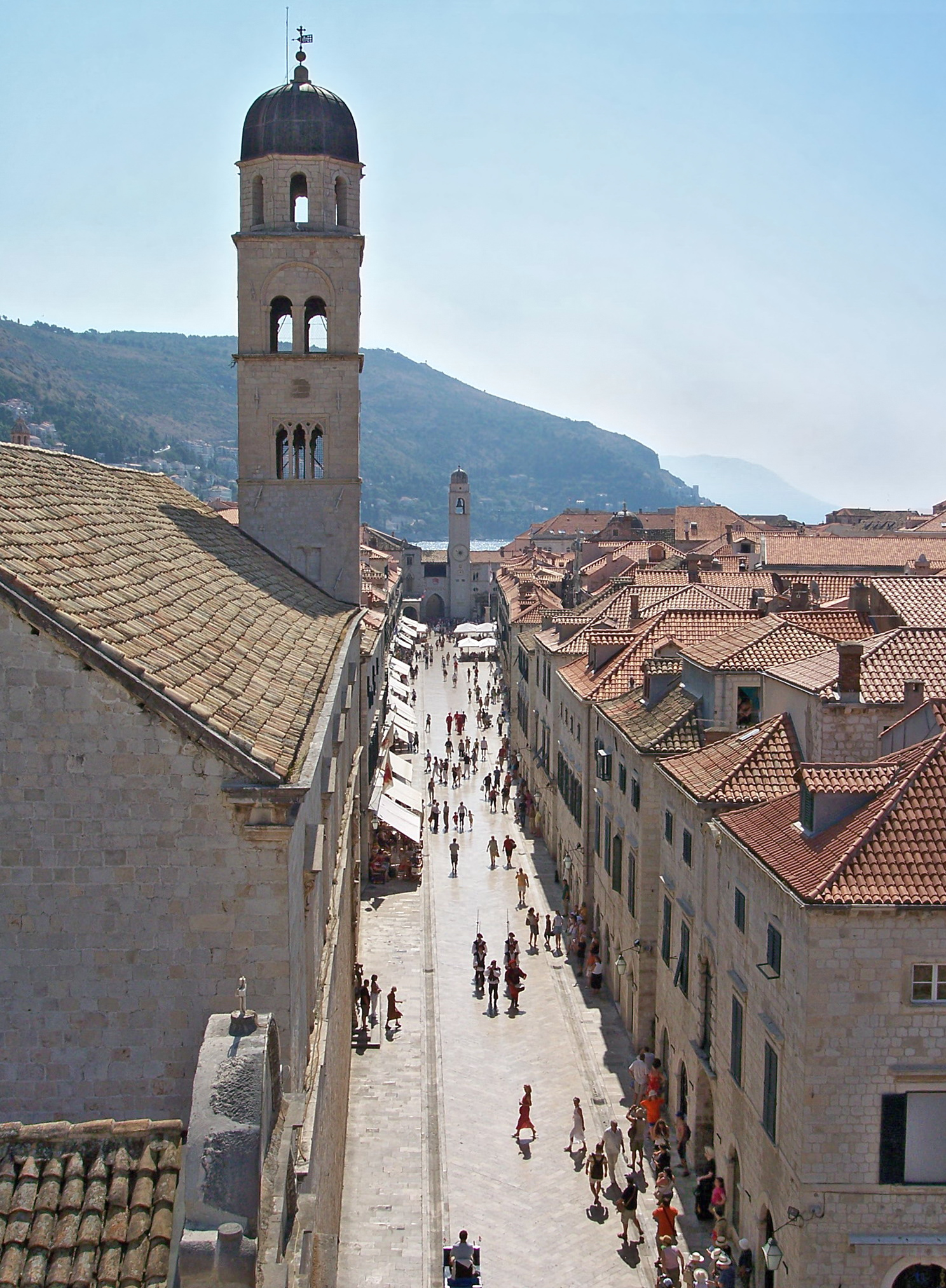
View of Stradun.

== See also ==
- 1667 Dubrovnik earthquake
- St. Saviour Church, Dubrovnik
- Walls of Dubrovnik
