= Donje Obuljeno =

- Village
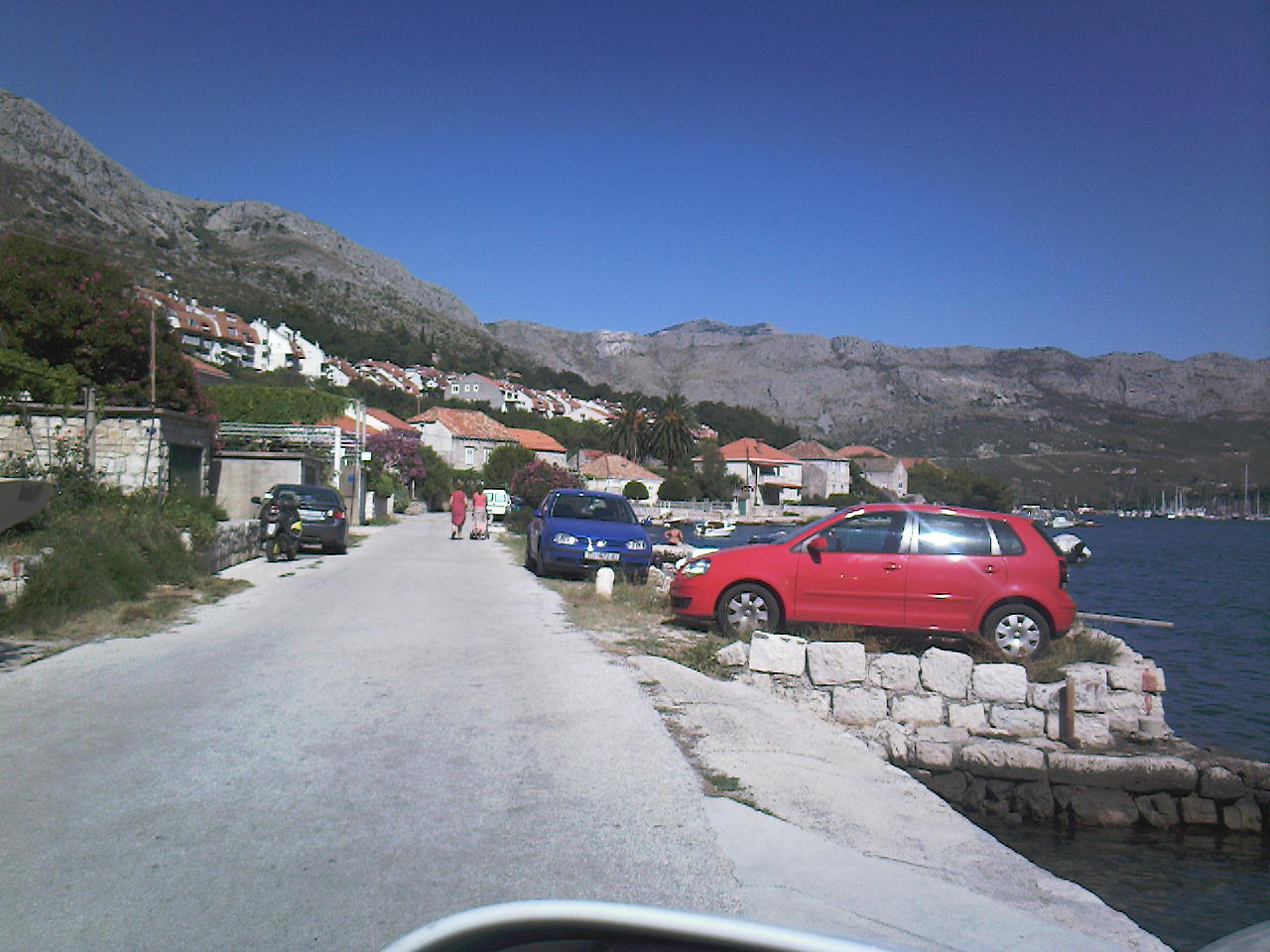

- Location within Croatia
- Coordinates: 42.6678839°N 18.1018376°E
- Country: Croatia
- County: Dubrovnik-Neretva County
- Municipality: Dubrovnik

Area
  - Total: 0.23 sq mi (0.6 km^{2})

Population (2021)
  - Total: 243
  - Density: 1,000/sq mi (410/km^{2})
- Time zone: UTC+1 (CET)
  - Summer (DST): UTC+2 (CEST)

Donje Obuljeno is a village in Croatia.

== Demographics ==
According to the 2021 census, its population was 243.
