= Gornje Obuljeno =

- Village
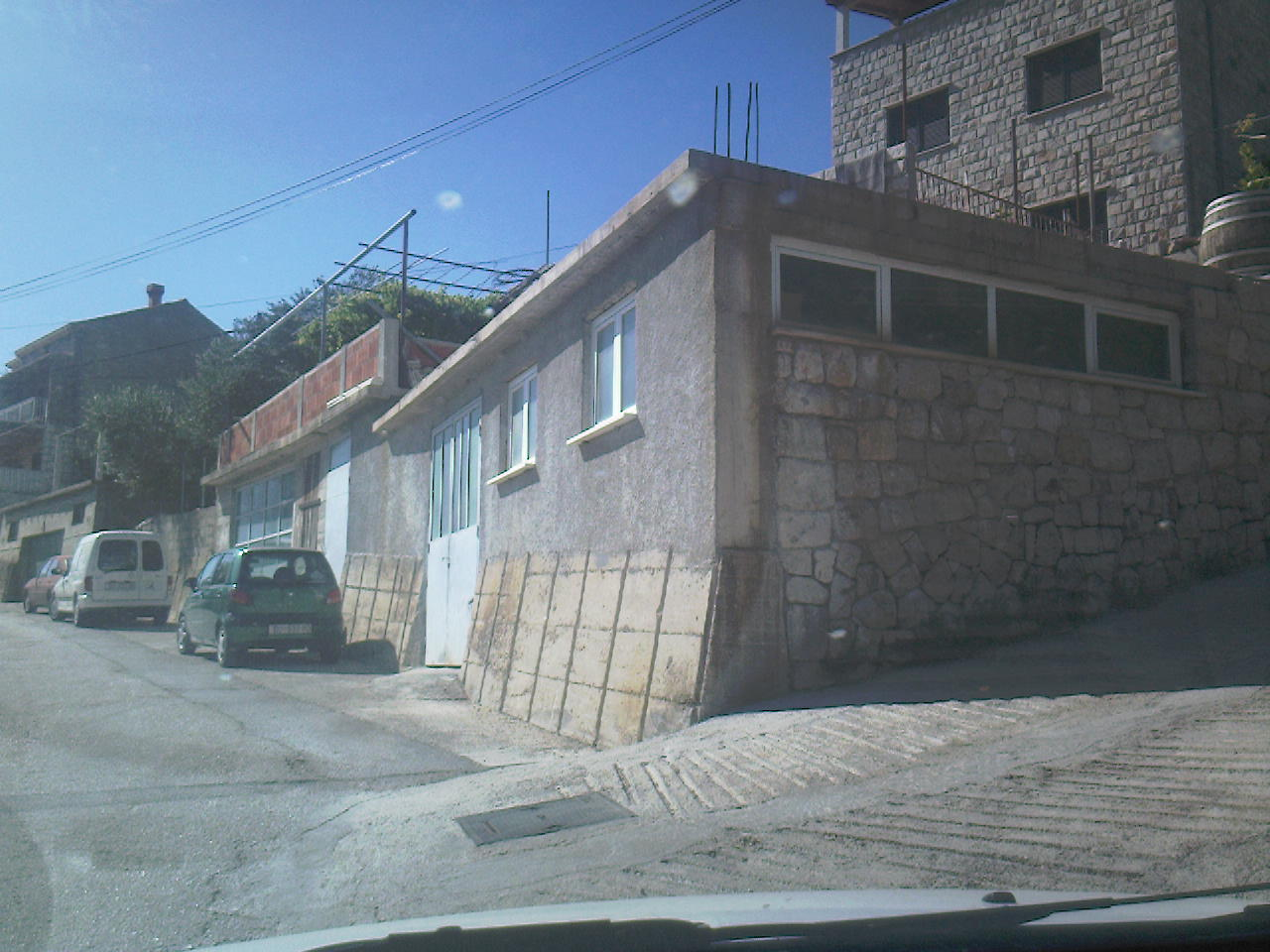

- Location within Croatia
- Coordinates: 42.6816443°N 18.1051103°E
- Country: Croatia
- County: Dubrovnik-Neretva County
- Municipality: Dubrovnik

Area
  - Total: 0.35 sq mi (0.9 km^{2})

Population (2021)
  - Total: 141
  - Density: 410/sq mi (160/km^{2})
- Time zone: UTC+1 (CET)
  - Summer (DST): UTC+2 (CEST)

Gornje Obuljeno is a village in Croatia.

== Demographics ==
According to the 2021 census, its population was 141.
