= Čajkovica =

- Village
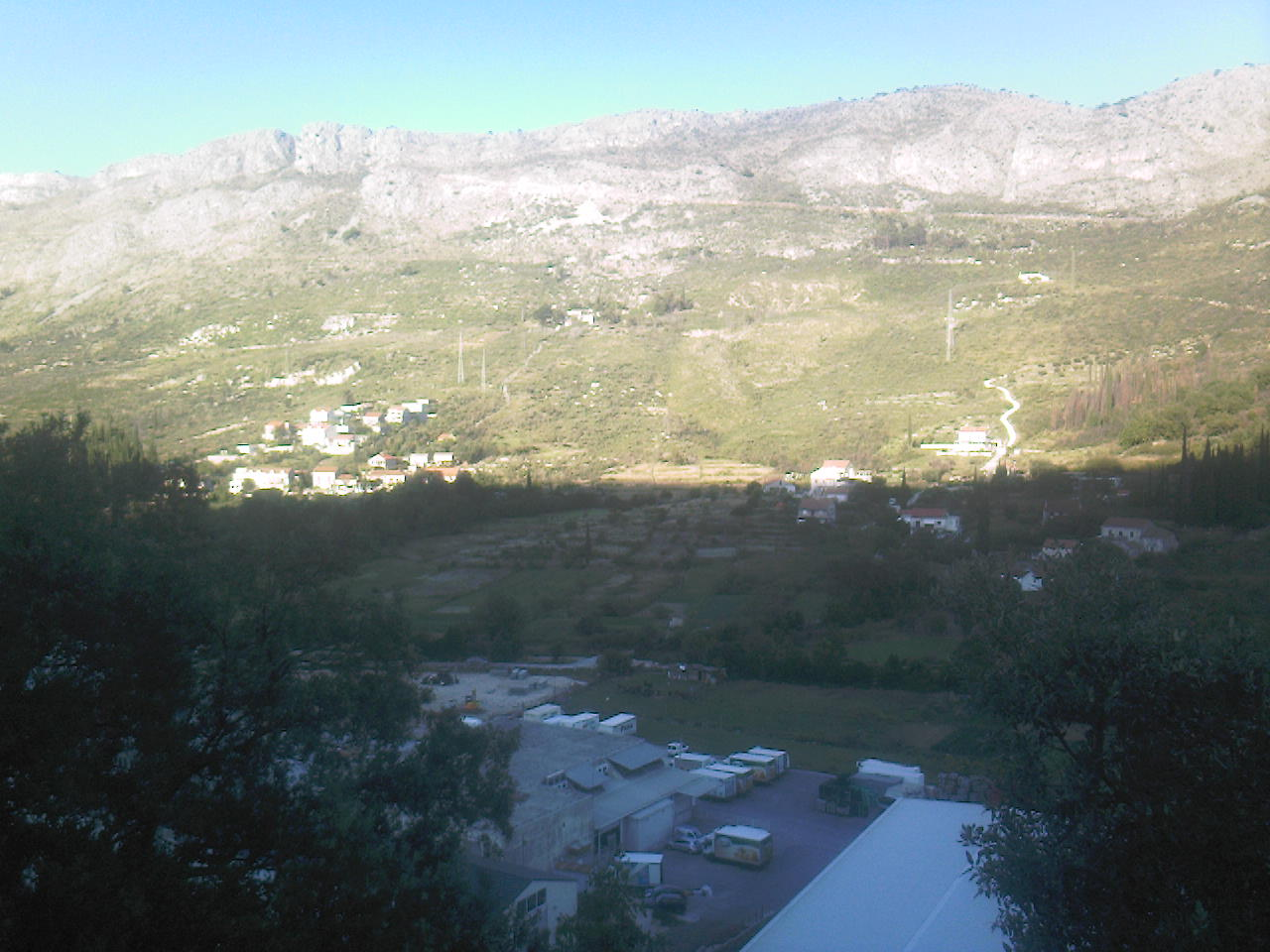

- Location within Croatia
- Coordinates: 42.6634842°N 18.1278058°E
- Country: Croatia
- County: Dubrovnik-Neretva County
- Municipality: Dubrovnik

Area
  - Total: 0.50 sq mi (1.3 km^{2})

Population (2021)
  - Total: 192
  - Density: 380/sq mi (150/km^{2})
- Time zone: UTC+1 (CET)
  - Summer (DST): UTC+2 (CEST)

Čajkovica is a village in Croatia.

== Demographics ==
According to the 2021 census, its population was 192.
