= Bosanka =

- Village
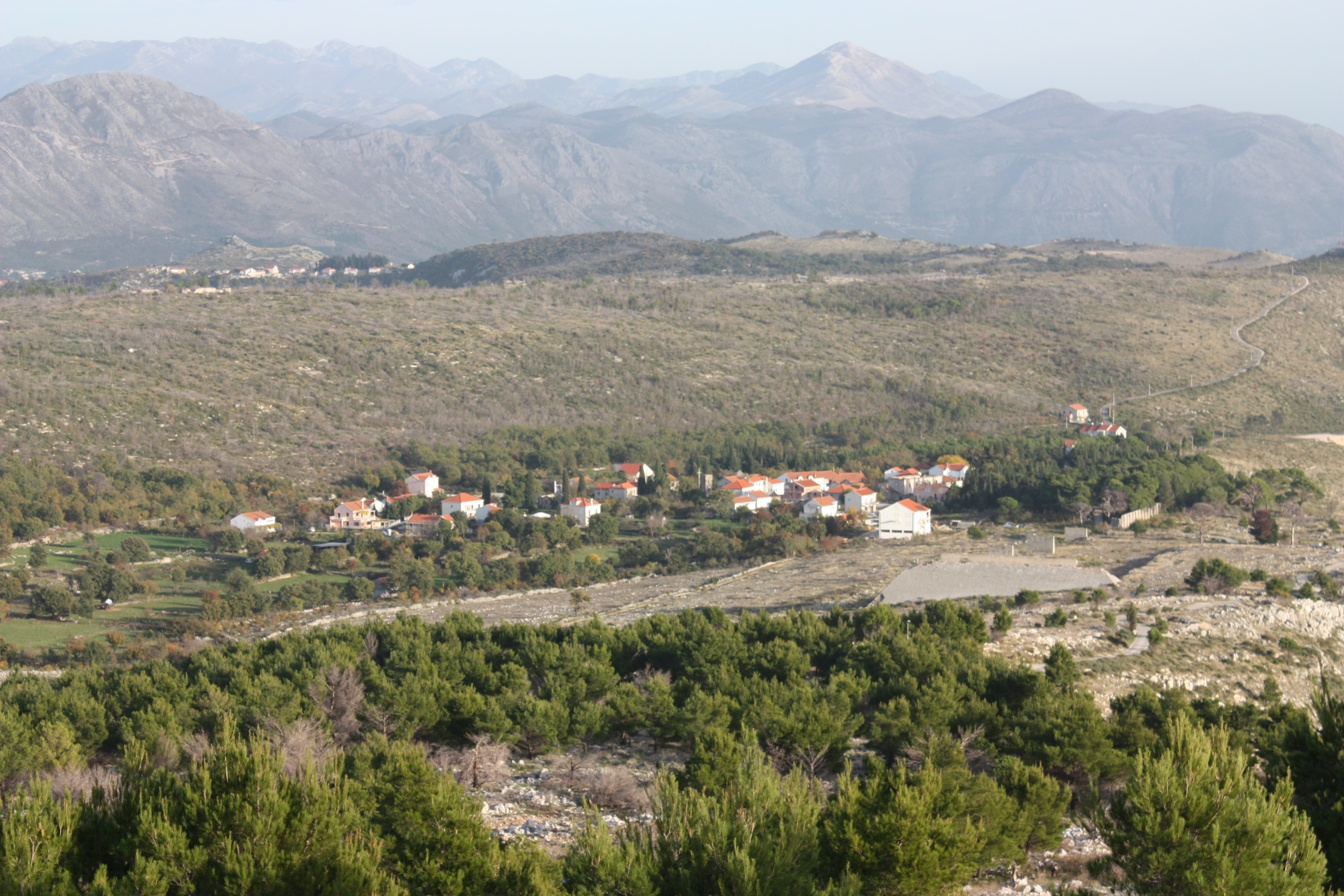

- Location within Croatia
- Coordinates: 42.6448476°N 18.1178369°E
- Country: Croatia
- County: Dubrovnik-Neretva County
- Municipality: Dubrovnik

Area
  - Total: 0.66 sq mi (1.7 km^{2})

Population (2021)
  - Total: 169
  - Density: 260/sq mi (99/km^{2})
- Time zone: UTC+1 (CET)
  - Summer (DST): UTC+2 (CEST)

Bosanka is a village in Croatia.

== Demographics ==
According to the 2021 census, its population was 169.
