= Čajkovići =

- Village
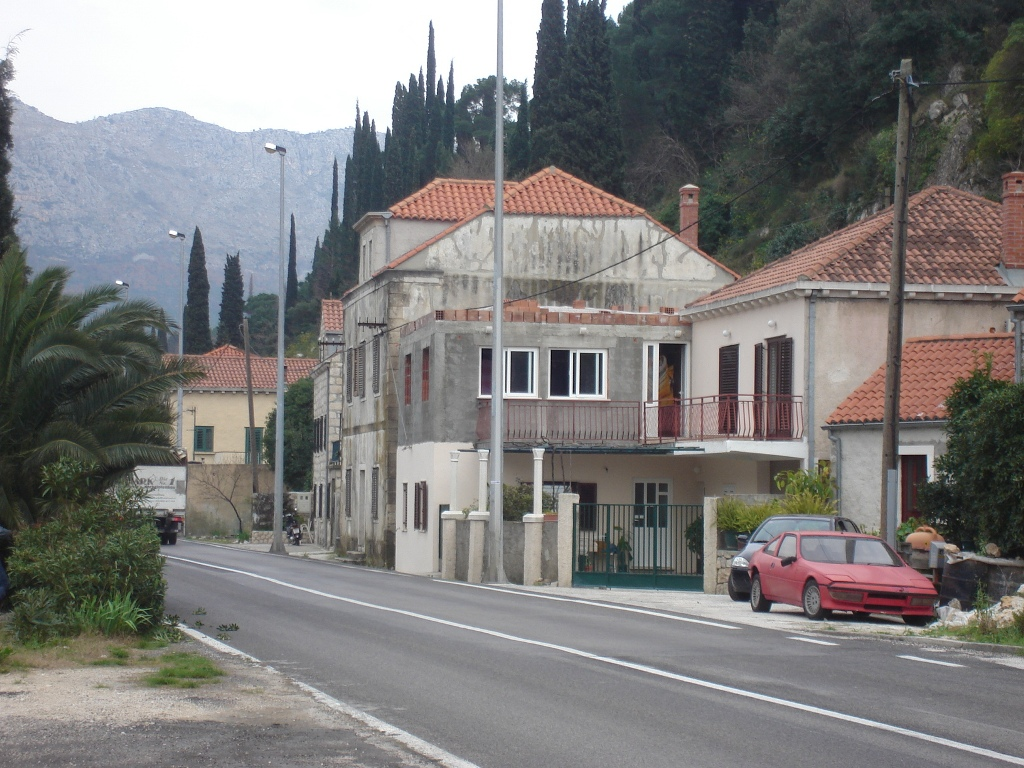

- Location within Croatia
- Coordinates: 42.6675389°N 18.1107782°E
- Country: Croatia
- County: Dubrovnik-Neretva County
- Municipality: Dubrovnik

Area
  - Total: 0.23 sq mi (0.6 km^{2})

Population (2021)
  - Total: 23
  - Density: 99/sq mi (38/km^{2})
- Time zone: UTC+1 (CET)
  - Summer (DST): UTC+2 (CEST)

Čajkovići is a village in Croatia.

== Demographics ==
According to the 2021 census, its population was 23.
