= Mravinjac =

Mravinjac may refer to:

- Mravinjac, Bosnia and Herzegovina, a village near Goražde
- Mravinjac, Croatia, a village near Dubrovnik
