= Mravinjac, Croatia =

Mravinjac
- Village
- Location within Croatia
- Coordinates: 42.7584607°N 17.9424084°E
- Country: Croatia
- County: Dubrovnik-Neretva County
- Municipality: Dubrovnik

Area
  - Total: 4.9 sq mi (12.7 km^{2})

Population (2021)
  - Total: 67
  - Density: 14/sq mi (5.3/km^{2})
- Time zone: UTC+1 (CET)
  - Summer (DST): UTC+2 (CEST)

Mravinjac is a village in Croatia.

== Demographics ==
According to the 2021 census, its population was 67.
