= Gromača =

- Village
- Location within Croatia
- Coordinates: 42.7373876°N 17.9782075°E
- Country: Croatia
- County: Dubrovnik-Neretva County
- Municipality: Dubrovnik

Area
  - Total: 4.0 sq mi (10.3 km^{2})

Population (2021)
  - Total: 149
  - Density: 37.5/sq mi (14.5/km^{2})
- Time zone: UTC+1 (CET)
  - Summer (DST): UTC+2 (CEST)

Gromača is a village in Croatia.

== Demographics ==
According to the 2021 census, its population was 169.
