= Kliševo =

- Village
- Location within Croatia
- Coordinates: 42.7408914°N 17.9514939°E
- Country: Croatia
- County: Dubrovnik-Neretva County
- Municipality: Dubrovnik

Area
  - Total: 1.9 sq mi (4.9 km^{2})

Population (2021)
  - Total: 52
  - Density: 27/sq mi (11/km^{2})
- Time zone: UTC+1 (CET)
  - Summer (DST): UTC+2 (CEST)

Kliševo is a village in Croatia.

== Demographics ==
According to the 2021 census, its population was 52.
