= List of ambassadors of Italy =

Ambassador of Italy
- Emblem of Italy

Italian Ambassadors are the official diplomatic representatives of the Government of Italy.

== List of representatives ==
Flag State (polity)	Diplomatic accreditation	Ambassador	List of ambassadors	Reference
Afghanistan	June 29, 2020	Natalia Quintavalle	List	
Albania	January 8, 2020	Marco Alberti	List	
Algeria	January 22, 2024	Alberto Cutillo	List	
Angola	July 21, 2020	Cristiano Gallo	List	
Argentina	August 26, 2021	Fabrizio Lucentini	List	
Armenia	May 18, 2021	Alfonso Di Riso	List	
Australia	August 16, 2022	Paolo Crudele	List	
Austria	February 20, 2024	Giovanni Pugliese	List	
Azerbaijan	June 17, 2021	Claudio Taffuri	List	
Bangladesh	January 15, 2019	Enrico Nunziata	List	
Bahrain	January 15, 2020	Paola Amadei	List	
Belarus	April 26, 2018	Mario Giorgio Stefano Baldi	List	
Belgium	January 27, 2023	Federica Favi	List	
Bolivia	July 3, 2019	Francesco Tafuri	List	
Bosnia-Herzegovina	January 7, 2020	Marco Di Ruzza	List	
Brazil	October 2, 2023	Alessandro Cortese	List	
Bulgaria	January 5, 2021	Giuseppina Zarra	List	
Burkina Faso	March 1, 2019	Andrea Romussi	List	
Cameroon	October 15, 2021	Filippo Scammacca del Murgo	List	
Canada	May 20, 2021	Andrea Ferrari	List	
Chile	May 4, 2023	Valeria Biagiotti	List	
China	May 16, 2023	Massimo Ambrosetti	List	
Colombia	December 17, 2018	Gherardo Amaduzzi	List	
Costa Rica	June 29, 2022	Alberto Colella	List	
Croatia	January 7, 2020	Pierfrancesco Sacco	List	
Cuba	May 3, 2021	Roberto Vellano	List	
Cyprus	January 10, 2022	federica Ferrari Bravo	List	
Czech Republic	September 30, 2021	Mauro Marsili	List	
Democratic Republic of the Congo	April 13, 2022	Alberto Petrangeli	List	
Denmark	September 30, 2022	Stefania Rosini	List	
Dominican Republic	September 20, 2021	Stefano Queirolo Palmas	List	
Ecuador	December 2, 2019	Caterina Bertolini	List	
Egypt	November 15, 2021	Michele Quaroni	List	
El Salvador	September 25, 2020	Edoardo Pucci	List	
Eritrea	September 18, 2020	Marco Mancini	List	
Estonia	December 2, 2019	Daniele Rampazzo	List	
Ethiopia	October 14, 2021	Agostino Palese	List	
Finland	July 13, 2020	Sergio Pagano	List	
France	October 10, 2022	Emanuela D'Alessandro	List	
Gabon	October 29, 2018	Gabriele Di Muzio	List	
Georgia	December 19, 2019	Enrico Valvo	List	
Germany	March 12, 2021	Armando Varricchio	List	
Ghana	August 24, 2020	Daniela D’Orlandi	List	
Greece	June 8, 2020	Patrizia Falcinelli	List	
Guatemala	October 9, 2020	Paolo De Nicolò	List	
Guinea	January 3, 2022	Stefano Pontesilli	List	
Honduras		Embassy closed on December 31, 2014.	List	
Holy See	February 19, 2022	Francesco Di Nitto	List	
Hungary	June 14, 2021	Manuel Jacoangeli	List	
India	December 4, 2019	Vincenzo de Luca	List	
Indonesia	July 6, 2020	Benedetto Latteri	List	
Iran	June 19, 2019	Giuseppe Perrone	List	
Iraq	December 14, 2021	Maurizio Greganti	List	
Ireland	June 9, 2022	Ruggero Corrias	List	
Israel	October 1, 2021	Sergio Barbanti	List	
Ivory Coast	October 15, 2021	Arturo Luzzi	List	
Japan	October 1, 2021	Gianluigi Benedetti	List	
Jordan	March 1, 2022	Luciano Pezzotti	List	
Kazakhstan	September 1, 2021	Marco Alberti	List	
Kenya	September 13, 2022	Roberto Natali	List	
Kosovo	September 27, 2021	Antonello De Riu	List	
Kuwait	September 16, 2019	Carlo Baldocci	List	
Latvia	March 28, 2022	Alessandro Monti	List	
Lebanon	February 5, 2020	Nicoletta Bombardiere	List	
Libya	February 1, 2019	Giuseppe Maria Buccino Grimaldi	List	
Lithuania	September 15, 2020	Diego Ungaro	List	
Luxembourg	June 15, 2020	Diego Brasioli	List	
Malaysia	October 18, 2021	Massimo Rustico	List	
Maldives	July 1, 2024	Damiano Francovigh	List	
Malta	January 16, 2021	Fabrizio Romano	List	
Mexico	October 28, 2019	Luigi De Chiara	List	
Moldova	April 15, 2021	Lorenzo Tomassoni	List	
Monaco	July 13, 2020	Giulio Alaimo	List	
Mongolia	October 14, 2019	Laura Bottà	List	
Montenegro	July 11, 2022	Andreina Marsella	List	
Morocco	March 1, 2021	Armando Barucco	List	
Mozambique	November 13, 2020	Gianni Bardini	List	
Myanmar	July 1, 2022	Nicolò Tassoni Estense	List	
Netherlands	December 7, 2020	Giorgio Novello	List	
New Zealand	October 28, 2020	Francesco Calogero	List	
Nicaragua	July 15, 2022	Simone De Santi	List	
Niger	July 1, 2021	Emilia Gatto	List	
Nigeria	January 4, 2022	Stefano De Leo	List	
North Macedonia	October 30, 2020	Paolo Palminteri	List	
Norway	June 28, 2022	Stefano Nicoletti	List	
Oman	January 26, 2023	Pierluigi D'Elia	List	
Organization for Security and Co-operation in Europe	January 4, 2021	Andrea Cascone	List	
Pakistan	February 10, 2020	Andreas Ferrarese	List	
Panama	November 9, 2021	Fabrizio Nicoletti	List	
Paraguay	March 13, 2023	Marcello Fondi	List	
Peru	November 5, 2018	Giancarlo Maria Curcio	List	
Philippines	September 2, 2021	Davide Giglio	List	
Poland	February 13, 2023	Luca Franchetti Pardo	List	
Portugal	January 4, 2020	Carlo Formosa	List	
Qatar	October 18, 2022	Paolo Toschi	List	
Republic of the Congo	February 7, 2022	Luigi Diodati	List	
Romania	July 16, 2021	Alfredo Maria Durante Mangoni	List	
Russia	October 1, 2021	Giorgio Starace	List	
San Marino	September 28, 2020	Sergio Mercuri	List	
Saudi Arabia	June 3, 2020	Roberto Cantone	List	
Senegal	July 4, 2020	Giovanni Umberto De Vito	List	
Serbia	June 14, 2022	Luca Gori	List	
Singapore	September 27, 2021	Mario Andrea Vattani	List	
Slovakia	May 10, 2021	Catherine Flumiani	List	
Slovenia	January 13, 2020	Carlo Campanile	List	
Somalia	October 7, 2019	Alberto Vecchi	List	
South Africa	April 5, 2019	Paolo Cuculi	List	
South Korea	March 1, 2019	Federico Failla	List	
Spain		Giuseppe Buccino Grimaldi	List	
Sri Lanka	December 3, 2018	Rita Giuliana Mannella	List	
Sudan	September 12, 2022	Michele Tommasi	List	
Sweden	May 7, 2021	Vinicio Mati	List	
Switzerland	June 14, 2019	Silvio Mignano	List	
Syria		Stefano Ravagnan	List	
Tanzania	March 29, 2021	Giuseppe Sean Coppola	List	
Thailand	October 17, 2022	Paolo Dionisi	List	
Tunisia	October 6, 2022	Fabrizio Saggio	List	
Turkey	January 3, 2022	Giorgio Marrapodi	List	
Turkmenistan	November 28, 2022	Luigi Ferrari	List	
Uganda	October 21, 2019	Massimiliano Mazzanti	List	
Ukraine	January 11, 2021	Pier Francesco Zazo	List	
United Arab Emirates	October 5, 2022	Lorenzo Fanara	List	
United Kingdom	October 7, 2022	Inigo Lambertini	List	
United Nations	March 1, 2023	Bruno Archi	List	
United States	March 12, 2021	Mariangela Zappia	List	
Uruguay	February 19, 2024	Fabrizio Petri	List	
Uzbekistan	January 5, 2026	Guido De Sanctis	List	
Venezuela	June 20, 2019	Placido Vigo	List	
Vietnam	January 16, 2019	Antonio Alessandro	List	
Yemen		Andrea Barbalonga	List	
Zambia	January 16, 2023	Enrico De Agostini	List	
Zimbabwe	August 24, 2022	Umberto Malnati	List	

== See also ==
- List of diplomatic missions of Italy
- List of ambassadors of Italy to the Ottoman Empire
