= Gjorgji Filipov =

Macedonian diplomat

Gjorgji Filipov / Ѓорѓи Филипов
- Born: October 26, 1956 (age 69); Kavadarci, Republic of Macedonia

Gjorgji Filipov (Macedonian: Ѓорѓи Филипов) is a Macedonian diplomat. In 2014 he is the Ambassador of Macedonia in Vienna, Austria as well as Ambassador of Macedonia to Japan and Slovakia. He was founder and first director of the Macedonian State Office of Industrial property from (1993 to 1999). He holds a PhD in the field of Industrial Property. The title of the doctoral thesis was:"Industrial Property as an Indicator for Technological Development“.

In 1993, the Government of the Republic of Macedonia appointed Mr. Filipov to be Director of the State Industrial Property Protection Office of the Republic of Macedonia. He founded the Office and held this position until 1999. Filipov successfully opened the door for Macedonian inventors to the international arena. At the same time, by acceptance of foreign applications and granting protection of IP rights in the Republic of Macedonia, the country became a part of the world IPR community. In 1996, under his guidance and auspices, the Macedonian inventor, Vancho Dimitrov won the Grand Prix of the International Jury on the Brussel's World's Invention Exhibition „EUREKA“. Filipov also prepared the Agreement for extension of EPO patents to Macedonia. In 2005, Filipov has been appointed as the Ambassador of the Republic of Macedonia in Berlin, Germany.

== Education ==
- 1998: Ph.D., Doctor of Technical Sciences, Sts. Cyril and Metodious University in Skopje, Thesis Title: “Industrial Property as an Indicator of Technological Development”;
- 1985: M.Sc., Master of Mechanical Engineering Sciences, Sts. Cyril & Metodious University in Skopje;
- 1981: Graduated Mechanical Engineer, Sts. Cyril & Metodious University in Skopje.

== Career ==
=== Engineering, academic and business career ===
From 1981 through 1993, he worked for the Koncar Company, Skopje, rising to marketing director. Then, (1992–93), he founded and was CEO of "Berin Marketing, Research and Development" Company, Skopje; and (1999-) Chairman of the board of directors in Intellectual Property Agency "Berin", Skopje. During 2000, he was the Editor in Chief of the Magazine “Intellectual Property Law and Management”, Skopje;

- (1998–2004) Assistant Professor (Docent) of “Industrial Property Management” and of “Marketing & Management", (2004–2011), Associated Professor of "Management in the Field of Informatics Technology”, Sts. Cyril & Metodious University in Skopje,(2001–2005), President of the Union of Inventors and Authors of Technical Improvements of Macedonia (SPATUM). Since 2011 he has been Elected Associated Professor at Sts. Cyril & Metodious University in Skopje .In 2013 Gjorgji Filipov was elected to be a member of "European Academy of Sciences and Arts", in Salzburg, Austria.

=== IP career ===
In 1993, after an honorable invitation from the Minister for Development and from the Prime Minister of the Macedonian Government, Filipov founded the first State Industrial Property Protection Office of the Republic of Macedonia in Skopje and became its first director being on this position until 1999. He successfully opened the door for Macedonian inventors to the international arena. At the same time, by acceptance of foreign applications and granting protection of IP rights in the Republic of Macedonia, the country became a part of the world IPR community. In 1996, under his guidance and auspices, the Macedonian inventor Vancho Dimitrov won the Grand Prix of the International Jury on the Brussel's World's Invention Exhibition „EUREKA“. Filipov also prepared the Agreement for extension of EPO patents to Macedonia.

- (1993–1999): Director of Macedonian "Industrial Property Protection Office";
- (2002–04): Member of the executive committee of the International Federation of Inventors Associations, Geneva;
- (2001–05): President of the Union of Inventors and Authors of Technical Improvements of Macedonia, Skopje;
- (2000–01): Consultant of Luxembourg's Government for Projects in Macedonia, Luxembourg/Skopje;
- In the meanwhile he is involved in various international organizations dealing with IP matters (WIPO, FICPI, INTA, and IFIA). He wrote several books and held numerous lectures on IP Topics at various Seminars and Symposiums and was present at all important exhibitions of inventions in the world.
- He used to be a Chief-In-Editor of the Magazine “Intellectual Property Law and Management”, WIPO lecturer on symposiums held in Europe, Africa and Asia, Consultant of Luxembourg's Government for IP Projects in Macedonia and is still a professional consultant in the field of Intellectual Property in many companies.

In 2009 he became European Patent Attorney and member of the Institute of Professional Representatives before the European Patent Office, (EPI).

=== Diplomatic career ===
- (1994–1999) Filipov, as a director of the Macedonian Industrial Property Protection Office (IPPO), represented Republic of Macedonia before the General Assembles and various bodies and committees of the World Intellectual Property Organization (WIPO) in Geneva and European Patent Organization (EPO) in Munich;

In 2005 Filipov has been appointed as the Ambassador of the Republic of Macedonia in Berlin, Germany;

- (2005–2010), Extraordinary and Plenipotentiary Ambassador of the Republic of Macedonia in Berlin, Germany;
- (2010–2014), Extraordinary and Plenipotentiary Ambassador of the Republic of Macedonia in Vienna, Austria;
- (2011–2014), Extraordinary and Plenipotentiary Ambassador of the Republic of Macedonia for Japan;
- (2012–2015), Extraordinary and Plenipotentiary Ambassador of the Republic of Macedonia for Slovakia.

== Published books ==
- "Forces of the reason", [Serbian, "Силе разума"] "Udruženje književnika Srbije" Publishing, Belgrade, 2016;
- ″Radius of the heart", [Macedonian, "Радиус на срцето"] "Berin" Publishing, Skopje, 2016;
- "Reasonable forces", [Macedonian, "Разумни сили"] "Berin" Publishing, Skopje,2015;
- ″Candle and Light″, [Macedonian, "Свеќа и светлина"] "Tri" Publishing, Skopje, 2013;
- ″Management & Marketing of Informatics Technology″, (CD, PPT, issued lessons by the author), UKIM, Skopje, 2004;
- ″Protection on Topography of Integrated Circuits″, (with V. Pepeljugoski), ″IPPO″, Skopje, 1999;
- ″About the Management - Directly″,[Macedonian, "За менаџментот - директно"], Skopje, ″Berin″ Publishing, 1995;
- ″General Manager No.1″, [Macedonian, "Генерален менаџер бр.1"], ″Berin″ Publishing, Skopje,1994;
- "How to do Business with Macedonia”, (with M. Danevska), ″Berin″ Publishing, Skopje, 1993.

== See also ==
- List of ambassadors to Slovakia
- List of ambassadors to Austria
