= Stefano Beltrame (diplomat) =

Italian diplomat

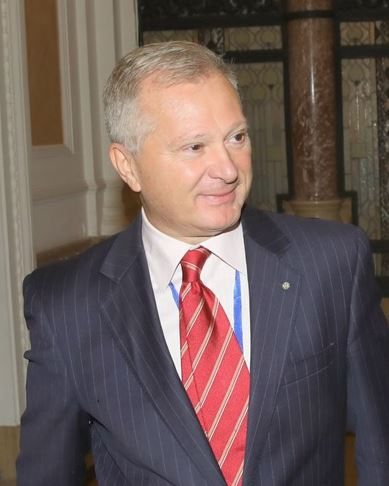

Ambassador of Italy to Austria
- Incumbent
- Assumed office October 1, 2021
- Preceded by: Sergio Barbanti

Personal details
- Born: December 8, 1960 (age 65) Verona, Italy
- Education: University of Padua
- Profession: Diplomat, author

Stefano Beltrame is an Italian ambassador and author. Since January 6, 2026, he is the Italian ambassador to the Russian Federation.

== Biography ==
After obtaining a degree in political sciences from University of Padua in 1985 he began his diplomatic career in 1991 at the Italian Ministry of Foreign Affairs and was assigned to the Directorate-General for Economic Affairs.

He served as diplomat in Kuwait (1993–1997), in Germany (Bonn–Berlin, 1998–2001), in Iran (2003–2006), as deputy head of mission, and in United States as First Counselor for Economic, Scientific and Commercial Matters (2006–2010).

Upon his return to Italy in 2010, he was appointed diplomatic advisor to the president of the Veneto Region, Luca Zaia in Venice and head of the Veneto regional office in Brussels.

Subsequently he was the consul general of Italy in Shanghai (2014–2018). He returned to Rome in 2018 as Diplomatic Advisor of the Minister of the Interior. From 2019 to 2021 he was the training manager of the Italian Ministry of Foreign Affairs and International Cooperation.

From October 1, 2021, he was Ambassador of Italy to Austria. From 2022 he served at the Ministry of Economy and Finance as Diplomatic Adviser to the Minister. On 6 January 2026, he started his mission as Ambassador of Italy to the Russian Federation.

He has published several historical and international political essays.

== Honours ==
Officer of the Order of Merit of the Italian Republic – December 27, 2009.

Knight of the Order of Merit of the Italian Republic – December 27, 2002.

== Publications ==
- Beltrame, Stefano (1999). Storia del Kuwait. Gli Arabi, il petrolio, l'occidente. Padova: CEDAM.
- Beltrame, Stefano (2003). La prima guerra del Golfo. Perché non fu presa Baghdad. Dalla cronaca all'analisi di un conflitto ancora aperto. Roma: ADNKronos Editore.
- Beltrame, Stefano (2009). Mossadeq, L'Iran, il petrolio, gli Stati Uniti e le radici della Rivoluzione islamica. Soveria Mannelli: Rubbettino.
- Beltrame, Stefano (2019). Breve storia degli italiani in Cina. Roma: Luiss University Press.
- Beltrame, Stefano; Marchetti, Raffaele (2022). Per la patria e per profitto. Multinazionali e politica estera dalle Compagnie delle Indie ai giganti del wen. Roma: Luiss University Press. ISBN 978-88-6150-729-6.

== See also ==
- Ministry of Foreign Affairs (Italy)
- Foreign relations of Italy
- List of ambassadors of Italy
