= Giovanni Gallina =

Giovanni Gallina may refer to:

- Giovanni Gallina (diplomat) (1852–1936), Italian diplomat and politician
- Giovanni Gallina (footballer) (1892–1963), Italian footballer
