= Carlo Maria Alberto Aliotti =

Italian politician

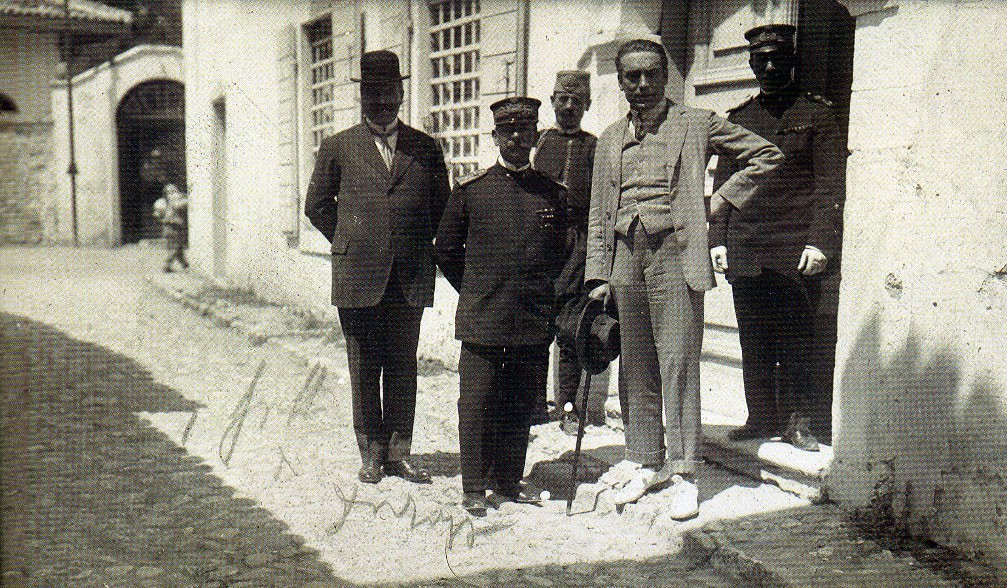

Italian Ambassador to Venezuela
- In office December 1902 – April of 1903
- Succeeded by: Giovanni Paolo Riva

Italian Ambassador to France
- In office 1908–1908
- Preceded by: Giovanni Gallina
- Succeeded by: Antonino Paternò Castello di San Giuliano

Italian Ambassador to Mexico
- In office April 11, 1912 – October 1913
- Preceded by: Annibale Raybaudi-Massiglia
- Succeeded by: Silvio Cambiagio

Italian Ambassador to Albania
- In office February 21st 1914 – mid-August 1914
- Succeeded by: Gaetano Manzoni

Italian Ambassador to China
- In office November 8, 1916 – 1917
- Preceded by: Carlo Sforza
- Succeeded by: Vittorio Cerruti

Italian Ambassador to the United States
- In office October 1, 1920 – November 1, 1920
- Preceded by: Camillo Romano Avezzana
- Succeeded by: Vittorio Rolandi Ricci

Italian Ambassador to Japan
- In office November 9, 1920 – November 12, 1922
- Preceded by: Raniero Paulucci di Calboli
- Succeeded by: Giacomo De Martino

Personal details
- Born: January 15, 1870 Smyrna, Ottoman Empire
- Died: February 8, 1923 (aged 53) La Spezia, Italy
- Cause of death: car accident
- Spouse(s): Aliotti, Fiorenza baronessa
- Children: daughter Buonacorsa Aliotti
- Parents: Baron Antonio Aliotti, former consul general of Tuscany in Smyrna. (father); Victoria Denotovich (mother)
- Education: Scuola superiore di Commercio - Venice
- Profession: Diplomat

Carlo Maria Alberto Aliotti was an Italian diplomat.

== Life ==
He graduated at the Scuola superiore di Commercio in Venice in 1890. On March 29, 1893, he entered the consular career and was employed in Constantinople, Thessaloniki and Vienna. In 1896 he is transferred to the diplomatic career and confirmed in Vienna, In 1900 he was sent to Saint Petersburg, Washington, D.C., and Buenos Aires.

In December 1902 he became Minister plenipotentiary to Venezuela, where he became Chargé d'affaires in 1903 in Caracas. In 1908 he was Chargé d'affaires in Paris. From April 11, 1912 to October 1913 he was Italian Ambassador to Mexico (Minister plenipotentiary to Mexico City).

On February 21, 1914, when the Albanian crisis has broken out he was designate extraordinary envoy and minister plenipotentiary, represented Italy in Durrës. He arrived in Albania on 10 March 1914 as Italian envoy at the time of Wilhelm, Prince of Albania and was active at the royal court in Durrës during and after the rebel insurrection against the prince. He was the patron of Essad Pasha Toptani and enabled him to leave Durrës as a free man for Italy on 20 May 1914. On 23 May 1914, it was Baron Aliotti who convinced Prince Wied to flee to the safety of the Italian naval vessel Misurata anchored in the bay of Durrës, an act that severely damaged the prince's reputation among his Albanian subjects. In mid-August 1914 he was replaced by Count Gaetano Manzoni. Despite the short time he spent in Albania, Aliotti played a prominent role in the tumultuous political events that unfolded in the six-month kingdom. The situation was particularly serious for domestic unrest and Austrian maneuvers that tended to eliminate any possible Italian influence in the area. Aliotti was convinced of the political and strategic importance of Albania for Italy, carried out, but with little luck, a continuous and energetic action in favor of the government of the Prince of Wied; this action aroused the protests of the ambassadors of the other powers of the Triple and, while it found consensus in the public opinion and in the Italian press, it often came into conflict with the more moderate politics of the Marquis Di San Giuliano.

In 1916 he became Minister plenipotentiary in China. In 1918 he became commissioner in Sofia Bulgaria.

In July 1920 he was in Albania again with Colonel Fortunato Castoldi to negotiate the Italian evacuation of Vlora. In August 1920, having Giovanni Giolitti decided to keep in Albania only the Sazan Island, Aliotti he was instructed to begin negotiations with the local Revolutionary Committee; he refused, however, shortly after the assignment and was replaced by Count Gaetano Manzoni .

In October 1920 he was stationed at the Embassy of Italy, Washington, D.C. On November 9, 1920, he became Italian Ambassador in Japan in Tokyo.

In November 1922 he was abruptly retired, with personal communication of Benito Mussolini.

== Publications ==
- He published a report on the methods of cultivation applied in certain arid regions of Mexico, proposing its extension to Cyrenaica ("Dry Farming" and the cultivation of cotton in the Lagoon of Torreón and Tlahualilo (States of Cohanila and Durando) to Mexico, to care of the ministry of the colonies, Rome 1913).
