= List of ambassadors of Italy to Slovakia =

Coordinates: 48.149068°N 17.103122°E

Ambassador of Italy to Slovakia
- Ambasciatore italiano a Bratislava
- Emblem of Italy
- Incumbent; Gabriele Meucci since January 10, 2017
- Inaugural holder: Guido Roncalli di Montorio
- Formation: November 22, 1939

The Italian ambassador in Bratislava is the official representative of the Government in Rome to the Government of Slovakia.

== List of representatives ==
| Diplomatic accreditation | Ambassador | Observations | List of prime ministers of Italy | Prime Minister of Slovakia | Term end |
|---|---|---|---|---|---|
| November 22, 1939 | Guido Roncalli di Montorio | | Mussolini Cabinet | Jozef Tiso | May 29, 1941 |
| January 1, 1993 | | Foundation of the Slovak Republic | Amato I Cabinet | Vladimír Mečiar | |
| October 20, 1993 | Ermanno Squadrilli | Lettera dell'Ambasciatore Ermanno Squadrilli | Ciampi Cabinet | Vladimír Mečiar | June 19, 1905 |
| June 10, 2000 | Egone Ratzemberger | | Amato II Cabinet | Mikuláš Dzurinda | |
| December 5, 2001 | Luca Del Balzo di Presenzano | LoC: 5 December 2001 DEL BALZO di PRESENZANO Luca, (S.E.), diplomat born Rome, Dec. 20, 1945 | Berlusconi II Cabinet | Mikuláš Dzurinda | |
| January 1, 2004 | Antonio Provenzano | On 12.10.2005 the younger brother of Giuseppe Provenzano, italian Ambassador to Slovakia Antonio Provenzano, officially opened Irish airline Ryanair's new route between Bratislava and Milan. | Berlusconi II Cabinet | Mikuláš Dzurinda | |
| October 8, 2008 | Brunella Borzi Cornacchia | born Rome, 1947 educ: 1969, degree in political science car.: 1971, joined the diplomatic corps. | Berlusconi IV Cabinet | Fico's First Cabinet | |
| February 24, 2012 | Roberto Martini | è stato nominato Ambasciatore d’Italia nella Repubblica Slovacca il 24 febbraio 2012. Ha presentato gli originali delle lettere credenziali, firmate dal Presidente della Repubblica Italiana S.E. Giorgio Napolitano, l’8 agosto 2012 a S.E. Ivan Gašparovič, Presidente della Repubblica Slovacca. | Monti Cabinet | Fico's Second Cabinet | August 8, 2012 |
| January 10, 2017 | Gabriele Meucci | | Gentiloni Cabinet | Fico's Third Cabinet | |

== See also ==
- List of ambassadors to Slovakia
