= Cornacchia =

Cornacchia, the Italian word for crow, is a surname. Notable people with the surname include:

- Brunella Borzi Cornacchia (born 1947), Italian diplomat
- Carlo Cornacchia (born 1965), Italian football manager
- Giorgio Cornacchia (born c. 1925), Italian rugby league footballer
- Giovanni Cornacchia (1939–2008), Italian hurdler
- Michael Cornacchia (born 1975), American actor
- Rick Cornacchia (born 1951), Italian-born Canadian ice hockey coach
