= Elena Basile =

Italian ex diplomat (born 1959)

Elena Basile OMRI
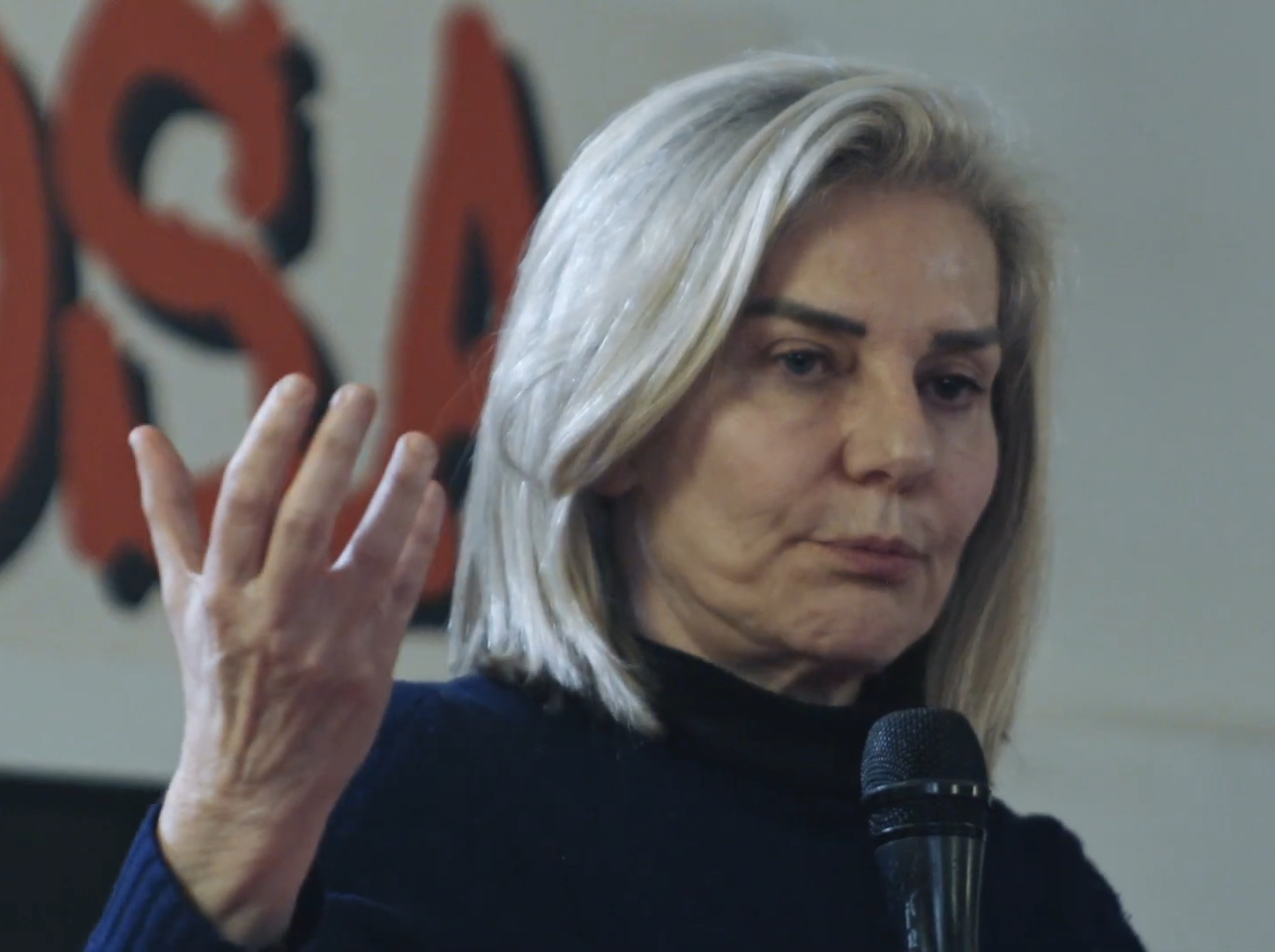
- Basile in March 2025

Minister Plenipotentiary
- In office 2013–2021

Ambassador of Italy to Sweden
- In office 2013–2017

Ambassador of Italy to Belgium
- In office 2017–2021

Personal details
- Born: 26 December 1959 Naples, Italy
- Education: University of Naples "L'Orientale"
- Profession: Diplomat, author

Elena Basile (born 26 December 1959) is a former Italian diplomat and author. From 2013 to 2021, she served as ambassador, whilst being a pro-tempore head of mission, to Sweden and Belgium, and in 2023 she left the diplomatic service with the rank of plenipotentiary.

== Life ==
=== Diplomatic career ===
Basile was born on 26 December 1959 in Naples. After graduating from the University of Naples "L'Orientale" in 1982, she joined the foreign service in 1985. She served for some years in Madagascar as first commercial secretary at the Italian embassy in Antananarivo and then as deputy consul in Toronto.

From 1999 to 2002 she was assigned to the Italian Embassy in Budapest, and from 2003 to 2007 in Lisbon. In 2008, she was head of the OSCE section of the Directorate General for Political and Security Affairs of the Italian Ministry of Foreign Affairs, and from 2010 to 2012 she was head of the North American countries unit at the same Directorate. From 2013 to 2017 she served as ambassador in Sweden, and from 2017 to 2021 in Belgium.

In 2023 she left the diplomatic service with the rank of minister plenipotentiary. In that year, the diplomats' union SNDMAE, while criticising Basile's views expressed in her journal commentaries, clarified that she had retired as a minister plenipotentiary, not an ambassador, having served as pro tempore head of mission in Sweden and Belgium.

=== Columnist and commentator ===
Between 2022 and 2023 Basile wrote several articles for Il Fatto quotidiano under the pseudonym "Ipazia", some of which were criticised as pro-Russian. In one of them she blamed Ukraine for the worsening of Russia–Ukraine relations, and accused the Ukrainian government of having "sent 250,000 young people to their death at the behest of NATO". Her views sparked controversy in July 2023, when she revealed her identity behind Ipazia. In October 2023, after the start of the Gaza war, she commented on the situation on the La7 television channel, taking a critical stance towards the Israeli government and Western countries.

In February 2024, Basile posted a video on Facebook criticising Holocaust survivor Liliana Segre for statements that Segre had not made. According to Basile, during the Gaza war Segre had expressed solidarity exclusively with Jewish children, thereby overlooking the suffering of Palestinian children. When Segre's family threatened legal action, Basile admitted her mistake and apologised publicly but was still sued because of the widespread circulation of her video and because her apology was deemed unsatisfactory.

=== Writer ===
As a writer, Basile made her debut in 1995 with Donne, nient'altro che donne. In 2014, her novel Una vita altrove was a finalist for the Rome Prize. A collection of short stories, Miraggi, published by Castelvecchi in 2018, was translated in French and published in Belgium in 2021. The 2022 novel In famiglia published by La nave di Teseo won the Premium International Florence Seven Stars for fiction. In 2023 she published the novel Un insolito trio. In 2024 she published L'Occidente e il nemico permanente and Frammenti di Bruxelles.

== Honours ==
Knight of the Order of Merit of the Italian Republic – 1996

Officer of the Order of Merit of the Italian Republic– 2005

== Publications ==
- Donne, nient'altro che donne (1995) Editrice Il Ventaglio
- Una vita altrove (2014) Newton Compton Editori ISBN 8854168769
- Miraggi (2018) Castelvecchi Editore ISBN 8832824353
- In famiglia (2022) La Nave di Teseo Editore ISBN 9788834610435
- Un insolito trio (2023) La Lepre Edizioni ISBN 9791280961167
- L'Occidente e il nemico permanente (2024) PaperFIRST ISBN 9791255430469

== See also ==
- List of ambassadors of Italy
- List of ambassadors of Italy to Belgium
