= Mannella =

Mannella is an Italian surname. Notable people with the surname include:

- Chris Mannella (born 1994), Canadian soccer player
- Enrico Pitassi Mannella (1882–1948), Italian army general
- Rita Giuliana Mannella (fl. 2018), Italian diplomat
