= Scialoja =

Scialoja is a surname. Notable people with the surname include:

- Mario Scialoja (1930–2012), Italian diplomat
- Vittorio Scialoja (1856–1933), Italian jurist and politician
