= List of ambassadors of Italy to Slovenia =

Coordinates: 46.046138°N 14.496029°E

Ambassador of Italy to Slovenia
- Italijanski Veleposlanik v RS; Ambasciatore d'Italia a Lubiana.
- Emblem of Italy
- Incumbent; Paolo Trichilo since January 11, 2016
- Inaugural holder: Fabio Christiani
- Formation: December 12, 1991

The Italian ambassador in Ljubljana is the official representative of the Government in Rome to the Government of Slovenia.

== List of representatives ==
Diplomatic accreditation	Ambassador	Observations	List of prime ministers of Italy	Prime Minister of Slovenia	Term end
December 12, 1991	Fabio Christiani	Consul General	Giulio Andreotti	Lojze Peterle	1992
1992	Fabio Christiani	Chargé d'affaires, (* 1948 in Rome) In 1971: graduated in Political Science at the University of Rome In 1975 he entered the diplomatic career. After a period at the Ministry at the Directorate General for Cultural and Scientific and Technical Cooperation, where he is in charge of organizing events to raise awareness of Italian cinema abroad. From 1978 to 1980 he was Vice Consul in Lyon. In 1980 he served at the Directorate General Emigration. Since 1983 he has been at the Embassy in Prague. From 1986 to 1989 he joined the Italian Delegation at the CSCE Conference in Vienna. Upon his return to Rome, he is assigned to the Directorate General for Political Affairs where he continues to follow the activities of the CSCE, also participating in the Vienna negotiations for the drafting of the "Paris Charter". At the end of 1990 he was nominated Consul General in Ljubljana and in 1992 Charge d Affairs with Letters in the Republic of Slovenia. From 1994 to 1998 he was First Counselor at the Embassy in Dublin and from 1998 to 2002, Deputy Representative at the Permanent Representation of Italy at the O.S.C.E. in Vienna. In 1993 he was awarded the honor of an Official Knight of the Order of Merit of the Republic. In 2002 he returned to the Ministry to serve again in the Directorate General for Multilateral Political Affairs and Human Rights where he directs the Office responsible for the OSCE. Since 2004 he has been Head of the Consulate General in Montreal and Permanent Representative at the International Civil Aviation Organization (ICAO). Returning to Rome, he served as Diplomatic Counselor of the Minister of Social Solidarity. Appointed Minister Plenipotentiary in 2007, from the following year he was Coordinator for Russia, Belarus, Ukraine and Caucasus at the Directorate General for the Countries of Europe.: From 2011 to Aug 16, 2013 he was Italian ambassador to the Republic of Macedonia.	Giuliano Amato	Janez Drnovšek	1993
1996	Luigi Solari	Slovenia and Croatia are united in their opposition to movements for Istrian autonomy and to any revisio to their detriment of the 1975 Treaty of Osimo, which had defined the borders between the SFRY and Italy, and had provided for the payment by the SFRY of compensation for Italian property transferred to Yugoslav sovereignty after 1947. Although Slovenia asserted that its dept in this matter (in accordance with the Treaty of Osimo and the 1983 Treaty of Rome) had been discharged in full, in 1993 some 35,000 Italians were reported to be demanding compensation for, or the restitution of, property on Slovenia. In July 1994 the Italian Government of Silvio Berlusconi stated that until the Slovenian authorities agreed to compensate Italian nationals who had fled after 1947 from territory now held by Slovenia, and whose property had been after 1947 from territory now held by Slovenia, and whose property had been confiscated under communist rule, Italy would block effort by Slovenia to achieve further integration with western Europe. Italy thus prevented scheduled negotiations on an association agreement between Slovenia and the EU until March 1995, when the new Italian Government of Lamberto Dini withdrew the veto. Preliminary agreement on trade and political co-operation was reached in June. However, it was not until May 1996 that Slovenia and Italy agreed to accopromise solution proposed by Spain, whereby Slovenia was to allow EU nationals to purchases property in Slovenia, on a reciprocal basis, within four years of the associacion agreement's ratification, and EU citizens who had previously permanently resident in Slovenia for a period of three years (thus including Italian nationals who had fled after the Second World war) would be permitted to buy immediately. In June Slovenia finally signed an association agreement with the EU, and simultaneously applied for full membership of the organization. At the beginning of July 1997 it was announced that Italy was to begin ratification of July 1997 it was announced that Italy was to begin ratification of the agreement brokered by Spain as soon as the Slovenian parliament had approved the European Agreement.	Carlo Azeglio Ciampi	Janez Drnovšek	
1997	Massimo Spinetti		Romano Prodi	Janez Drnovšek	1998
June 1, 1999	Norberto Cappello	(* February 12, 1943 in Rome), In 1966 he graduated in law at the University of Rome. In 1969 he entered his career. Among the positions held, after being assigned to the Secretariat of State, from 1971 to 1975 he was Second Commercial Secretary in London, then First Secretary in Teheran from 1975 to 1977 and First Secretary of the Permanent Diplomatic Representation of Italy to the Council of Europe in Strasbourg until 1980. When he returned to Rome, he was Head of the Secretariat of the Undersecretary of State from 1981 to 1983, then out of his position to work for the Ministry of the Interior. Back at the Farnesina, from 1984 to 1985 he was directly employed by the Head of the Press and Information Service and from 1985 to 1986 at the Directorate General for Political Affairs. From 1988 to 1992 he was First Counselor in London. Back in Rome, from 1992 to 1993 he was out of the position to serve in the Presidency of the Council of Ministers as Head of Cabinet of the Minister for the Coordination of Community Policies and Regional Affairs and the following year at the Department for Legal Affairs and Legislative as Head of the International and Community Affairs Sector. From 1994 to 1997, he served in the Office of the Diplomatic Counselor of the Presidency of the Council of Ministers with the post of Diplomatic Counselor, then from 1997 to 1999 in the Cabinet of the Minister of Foreign Affairs (Relationship Office with Parliament). From 1999 to 2004 he was Ambassador to Ljubljana. Again at the Ministry of Foreign Affairs, it is directly dependent on the Director General for Multilateral Economic and Financial Cooperation, seconded to Sanpaolo IMI.: From August 30, 2007 to August 2010 he was Italian ambassador to Belarus.	Massimo D’Alema	Janez Drnovšek	2004
2005	Daniele Verga	(* in Rome on 9 November 1943), a graduate in political science, has been a diplomatic career since 1974. Among the first positions held, after having served in the press and information service, in 1977 he was in Belgrade and in 1980 consul in Bastia. Back in Rome to the press and information service in 1985, in 1990 he became head of the secretary's special secretary of state and the following year first advisor to the permanent representation of Italy at the United Nations in Geneva, where he remained until 1996, when he was appointed first councilor in Ankara. Returning to the ministry in 1999, he was assigned to the Directorate General for the countries of the Mediterranean and the Middle East. In 2000 he was promoted to plenipotentiary minister and from 2001 he was deputy general manager for the countries of sub-Saharan Africa.	Silvio Berlusconi	Janez Janša	2006
August 6, 2008	Alessandro Pietromarchi		Silvio Berlusconi	Borut Pahor	
2011	Rossella Franchini Sherifis	(* in Ancona), began her mission in Luxembourg on September 19, 2016. She was employed in New York City, Belgrade, Athens. She was Italian ambassador to Luxembourg	Silvio Berlusconi	Borut Pahor	
January 11, 2016	Paolo Trichilo	(* August 12, 1964 in Rome) graduated in Political Science in November 1987 at the LUISS University of Rome, where he was Assistant to the Italian Court of Justice at the European Court of Human Rights, Carlo Russo, at the Chair of Human Rights (1987-1993). In 1986 he studied at the Department of Political Science at the University of Iowa in the United States thanks to the International Student Exchange Program (ISEP). Second lieutenant in the Arma Carabinieri (1989-1990) entered the diplomatic service in February 1990. Assigned to the Office on the Conference for Security and Cooperation in Europe and member of various Special Diplomatic Delegations at the CSCE (Vienna, Valletta, Moscow, Geneva, Helsinki), he was appointed to Consul in Mulhouse in November 1993. Counselor for economic and commercial affairs in Ankara since January 1998, on his return to Rome he was in succession Vicar of the Counter-Terrorism Coordinator (October 2001), member of the Task Force Iraq and of the Special Diplomatic Delegation in Iraq, as well as Vicar of the Unit of Crisis. Political Counselor (2004–06) and Deputy Head of Mission in New Delhi (2006–08), was First Counselor (2008–09) and Permanent Representative Added to Permanent Representation (2009–12) at the Organization for Cooperation and Economic Development (OECD) in Paris. Diplomatic Counselor of the Minister of Labor and Social Policies from October 2012 to December 2015, Ambassador to Slovenia from 11 January 2016. Minister Plenipotentiary since January 2012, and 'Official Knight of the Order of Merit of the Republic. He speaks English, French and Spanish and has diplomas from Portuguese, Russian and German. Married, two sons.	Paolo Gentiloni	Miro Cerar	

== See also ==
- List of ambassadors to Slovenia
- List of ambassadors to Slovenia
