= List of ambassadors to Slovenia =

This is a list of ambassadors to Slovenia. Note that some ambassadors are responsible for more than one country while others are directly accredited to Ljubljana.

== Current Ambassadors to Ljubljana ==
Sending country	Presentation of the credentials	Location of resident embassy	Ambassador
Albania	2014	Ljubljana, Slovenia	Pëllumb Qazimi
Algeria	2019	Budapest, Hungary	Ali Mokrani
Andorra	12.15.2011	Brussels, Belgium	Eva Descarrega Garcia
Angola	29.10.2012	Vienna, Austria	Maria de Jesus dos Reis Ferreira
Argentina	09.11.2006	Vienna, Austria	Eugenio Maria Curia
Armenia	04.05.2010	Rome, Italy	Rouben Karapetian
Australia	27.09.2012	Vienna, Austria	David Stuart
Austria	31.08.2012	Ljubljana, Slovenia	Clemens Koja
Azerbaijan	31.01.2012	Ljubljana, Slovenia	Galib Israfilov
Bangladesh	06.07.2010	Berlin, Germany	Mosud Mannan
Belarus		Vienna, Austria	Andrei Dapkiunas (Ambassador-designate)
Belgium	09.10.2012	Ljubljana, Slovenia	Paul Jansen
Belize	26.10.1999	Vienna, Austria	Alexander Piletsky
Benin		Geneva, Switzerland	vacant
Bosnia and Herzegovina	24.01.2012	Ljubljana, Slovenia	Slavko Puljić
Brazil	24.01.2012	Ljubljana, Slovenia	Gilberto Fonseca Guimarães de Moura
Bulgaria	05.12.2008	Ljubljana, Slovenia	Philip Georgiev Bokov
Burkina Faso	27.10.2011	Vienna, Austria	Hilaire Soulama (Chargé d'Affaires a.i.)
Burundi	13.08.2024	Rome, Italy	Ernest Ndabashinze
Cambodia	06.03.2008	Berlin, Germany	Chem Widhya
Canada	30.09.2010	Budapest, Hungary	Tamara Lynn Guttman
Cape Verde	17.09.2010	Brussels, Belgium	Maria de Jesus Veiga Miranda Mascarenhas
Chile	18.02.2011	Vienna, Austria	Alfredo Labbé
China	30.03.2012	Ljubljana, Slovenia	Zhang Xianyi
Colombia	14.06.2011	Vienna, Austria	Freddy Padilla de León
Costa Rica	17.03.2008	Vienna, Austria	Ana Teresa Dengo Benavides
Croatia	16.02.2009	Ljubljana, Slovenia	Svjetlan Berković
Cuba	08.06.2011	Vienna, Austria	Juan Carlos Marsán Aguilera
Cyprus	05.09.2011	Ljubljana, Slovenia	Costas Leontiou
Czech Republic	30.09.2009	Ljubljana, Slovenia	Petr Voznica
Denmark	15.09.2010	Ljubljana, Slovenia	Karsten Vagn Nielsen
Dominica		London, UK	vacant
Ecuador	09.05.2012	Rome, Italy	Carlos Vallejo López
Egypt	05.09.2011	Ljubljana, Slovenia	Heba Adly Guirguis Sedhom
Estonia	20.01.2011	Budapest, Hungary	Priit Pallum
Finland	02.11.2011	Ljubljana, Slovenia	Pekka Metso
France	16.05.2012	Ljubljana, Slovenia	Pierre-François Mourier
Georgia	12.02.2009	Bratislava, Slovakia	Alexander Nalbandov
Germany	06.08.2010	Ljubljana, Slovenia	Werner Burkart
Ghana	25.11.2010	Rome, Italy	Evelyn Anita Stokes–Hayford
Greece	24.01.2012	Ljubljana, Slovenia	Athanasiois Kallidopoulos
Guatemala	25.05.2007	Vienna, Austria	Carla María Rodríguez Mancia
Holy See	26.05.2011	Ljubljana, Slovenia	Juliusz Janusz
Hungary	26.01.2010	Ljubljana, Slovenia	István Szent-Iványi
Iceland	19.05.2010	Vienna, Austria	Stefán Skjaldarson
India	19.07.2010	Ljubljana, Slovenia	Jayakar Jerome
Indonesia	29.10.2012	Vienna, Austria	Rachmat Budiman (Chargé d'Affaires a.i.)
Iran	07.09.2010	Ljubljana, Slovenia	Aliakbar Rezaei
Iraq	20.06.2012	Sofia, Bulgaria	Surood R. Najib
Ireland	20.06.2012	Ljubljana, Slovenia	Kieran Dowling
Israel	06.12.2010	Jerusalem, Israel	Shmuel Meirom
Italy	20.09.2011	Ljubljana, Slovenia	Rossella Franchini Sherifis
Jamaica	10.2004	Geneve, Switzerland	Cheryl Spencer
Japan	22.02.2011	Ljubljana, Slovenia	Toshimitsu Ishigure
Jordan	03.04.2008	Vienna, Austria	Makram Queisi
Kazakhstan	06.03.2008	Budapest, Hungary	Rashid Ibrayev
Kosovo	25.05.2012	Ljubljana, Slovenia	Mimoza Ahmetaj
Kuwait	14.04.2010	Vienna, Austria	Mohammad Saad Oudah Al Sallal
Laos	19.10.2011	Vienna, Austria	Khamkheuang Bounteum
Latvia	19.07.2010	Ljubljana, Slovenia	Bahtijors Hasans
Lebanon	28.05.2009	Vienna, Austria	Ishaya El–Khoury
Libya	19.03.2008	Rome, Italy	Abdulhafed Gaddur
Lithuania	09.10.2012	Ljubljana, Slovenia	Izolda Bričkovskienė Stuart
Luxembourg	16.11.2011	Vienna, Austria	Hubert Wurth
Malaysia	18.07.2007	Budapest, Hungary	Kamilan Bin Maksom
Malta	27.02.2001	Valletta, Malta	Alex Agius Cesareo
Mexico	19.10.2007	Vienna, Austria	Alejandro Diaz y Pérez Duarte
Moldova	14.06.2011	Budapest, Hungary	Alexandru Codreanu
Monaco	31.10.2012	Rome, Italy	Jean-Philippe Bertani (Chargé d'Affaires a.i.)
Montenegro	17.08.2012	Ljubljana, Slovenia	Ivan Milić
Morocco	09.05.2012	Vienna, Austria	Ali El Mhamd
Namibia	10.09.2010	Vienna, Austria	Manassse U. Katjivena (Chargé d'Affaires a.i.)
Nepal	16.09.2010	Berlin, Germany	Suresh Prasad Pradhan
Netherlands	26.08.2009	Ljubljana, Slovenia	Johannes Douma
New Zealand	12.07.2011	Vienna, Austria	Philip Wallace Griffiths
Nicaragua		Rome, Italy	vacant
Nigeria	10.10.2011	Budapest, Hungary	Charles Azubuika Ononyo
North Korea	22.11.2006	Vienna, Austria	Kim Kwang Sop
North Macedonia	18.01.2011	Ljubljana, Slovenia	Igor Popov
Norway	13.09.2012	Budapest, Hungary	Vegar Andreassen (Chargé d'Affaires a.i.)
Oman	16.06.2008	Vienna, Austria	Badr Al–Hinai
Pakistan	25.10.2021	Ljubljana, Slovenia	Mr Janez Jelnikar, Honorary Consul
Palestine	20.12.2007	Rome, Italy	Sabri M. Ateyah
Panama	30.06.2009	Vienna, Austria	Luis Enrique Martínez Cruz (Chargé d'Affaires a. i.)
Paraguay	12.01.2011	Rome, Italy	Ana María Baiardi Quesnel
Peru	05.10.2009	Vienna, Austria	Antonio Garcia Revilla
Philippines	30.09.2010	Vienna, Austria	Lourdes Yarraguirre
Poland	01.02.2011	Ljubljana, Slovenia	Cezary Król
Portugal	0.05.2012	Ljubljana, Slovenia	Maria Leonor Jordão Penalva Esteves (Chargé d'Affaires en pied)
Qatar	23.03.2010	Berlin, Germany	Abdulrahman Mohamed Sulaiman Al–Khulaifi
Romania	22.11.2022	Ljubljana, Slovenia	Alexandru Grădinar
Russia	18.10.2019	Ljubljana, Slovenia	Timur Eyvazov
Rwanda	19.01.2011	The Hague, Netherlands	Immaculée Uwanyiligira
San Marino	12.06.2001	Acquaviva, San Marino	Renzo Ghiotti
Saudi Arabia	05.12.2008	Vienna, Austria	Mansour Bin Khalid Al Saud
Serbia	25.04.2012	Ljubljana, Slovenia	Aleksandar Radovanović
Seychelles	10.10.2011	Brussels, Belgium	Vivianne Fock Tave
Slovakia	16.06.2008	Ljubljana, Slovenia	Marianna Otavcová
Slovenia	07.06.2011	Athens, Greece	Robert Basej
South Africa	16.06.2010	Vienna, Austria	Xolisa Mfundiso Mabhongo
South Korea	02.09.2011	Vienna, Austria	Cho Hyun
Sovereign Military Order of Malta	11.03.2009	Ljubljana, Slovenia	Mariano Hugo Prince Windisch–Graetz
Spain	15.05.2009	Ljubljana, Slovenia	Anunciada Fernández de Córdova Alonso–Viguera
Sri Lanka	16.11.2011	Vienna, Austria	Aliyar Lebbe Abdul Azeez
Sudan	10.09.2009	Vienna, Austria	Mahmoud Hassan Elamin
Sweden	19.10.2011	Vienna, Austria	Nils Daag
Switzerland	19.07.2010	Ljubljana, Slovenia	Robert Reich
Syria	08.11.2010	Vienna, Austria	Bassam Sabbagh
Tanzania	02.04.2012	Rome, Italy	Salvator Marcus Mbilinyi (Chargé d'Affaires a. i.)
Thailand	28.04.2012	Vienna, Austria	Nongnuth Phetcharatana (Chargé d'Affaires a. i.)
Tunisia	16.11.2011	Rome, Italy	Mohamed Samir Koubaa
Turkey	02.08.2012	Ljubljana, Slovenia	Serra Kaleli
Ukraine	25.08.2011	Ljubljana, Slovenia	Mykola Kyrychenko
United Arab Emirates	04.05.2010	Rome, Italy	Abdulaziz Nasser Al Shamsi
United Kingdom	29.04.2014	Ljubljana, Slovenia	Tiffany Sadler (Chargé d'Affaires a.i.)
United States	15.11.2010	Ljubljana, Slovenia	Joseph Mussomeli
Uruguay	09.05.2012	Vienna, Austria	Diana Espino Pugliese de Papantonakis
Venezuela	07.10.2009	Ljubljana, Slovenia	Néstor Enrique López Martinez (Chargé d'Affaires a. i.)
Vietnam	12.07.2011	Vienna, Austria	Nguyen Thiep
Yemen	13.05.2011	Vienna, Austria	Abdulhakim Abdulrahman Al-Eryani
Zambia	13.01.2011	Berlin, Germany	Johnston Fanwell Chizinga

== See also ==
- Foreign relations of Slovenia
- List of diplomatic missions of Slovenia
- List of diplomatic missions in Slovenia
