= List of ambassadors of Italy to Russia =

Ambassador of Italy to the Russian Federation
- L'ambasciatore italiano a Mosca
- Emblem of Italy
- Incumbent; Giorgio Starace since October 1, 2021
- Style: His Excellency
- Residence: Embassy of Italy, Moscow
- Inaugural holder: Ferdinando Salleo
- Formation: January 12, 1992

The Ambassador of Italy to Russia (in Russian: посол Италии в России) is Italy's foremost diplomatic representative in Russia, and head of the Italy's diplomatic mission in Russia. The current ambassador in charge since October 1, 2021 is Giorgio Starace.

== List ==
- Ferdinando Salleo, January 12, 1992 - May 12, 1993
- Federico Di Roberto, May 12, 1993 - February 1, 1996
- Emanuele Scammacca del Murgo e dell'Agnone, February 1, 1996 - June 22, 1999
- Giancarlo Aragona, June 22, 1999 - November 5, 2001
- Gianfranco Facco Bonetti, November 5, 2001 - April 22, 2006
- Vittorio Claudio Surdo, April 22, 2006 - December 2010
- Antonio Zanardi Landi, December 2010 - September 2013
- Cesare Maria Ragaglini, September 2013 - January 2018
- Pasquale Terracciano, January 2018 - October 1, 2021
- Giorgio Starace, October 1, 2021 - In charge
