= List of ambassadors of Italy to Albania =

Ambassador of Italy to Albania
- Ambasador i Italisë në Shqipëri
- Emblem of Italy
- Inaugural holder: Carlo Maria Alberto Aliotti
- Formation: February 21, 1914

The Italian Ambassador to Albania is the Ambassador of the Italian government to the government of Albania.

Diplomatic accreditation	Ambassador	Observations	List of prime ministers of Italy	List of heads of state of Albania	Term end
February 21, 1914	Carlo Maria Alberto Aliotti		Antonio Salandra	William, Prince of Albania	August 15, 1914
August 15, 1914	Gaetano Manzoni		Antonio Salandra	William, Prince of Albania	
July 27, 1922	Marquis Carlo Durazzo		Benito Mussolini	William, Prince of Albania	
February 14, 1926	Pompeo Aloisi		Benito Mussolini	William, Prince of Albania	
June 2, 1927	Ugo Sola		Benito Mussolini	William, Prince of Albania	
May 29, 1930	Antonio Meli Lupi di Soragna		Benito Mussolini	Ahmet Zogu	
August 25, 1932	Ottavio Armando Koch		Benito Mussolini	Ahmet Zogu	
September 28, 1934	Mario Indelli		Benito Mussolini	Ahmet Zogu	
August 7, 1936	Francesco Jacomoni		Benito Mussolini	Ahmet Zogu	April 22, 1939
1939	Alberto Pariani	Italian invasion of Albania, Albanian Kingdom (1939–43)	Benito Mussolini	Vittorio Emanuele III	
June 30, 1949	Omero Formentini		Alcide De Gasperi	Omer Nishani	
July 8, 1952	Umberto Lanzetta		Alcide De Gasperi	Omer Nishani	
February 3, 1955	Giovanni Revedin di San Marino		Mario Scelba	Haxhi Lleshi	
January 22, 1958	Maurizio De Strobel Di Fratta e Campocigno		Adone Zoli	Haxhi Lleshi	
December 1, 1961	Tristano Gabrici		Amintore Fanfani	Haxhi Lleshi	
April 26, 1964	Tristano Gabrici		Aldo Moro	Haxhi Lleshi	
May 10, 1966	Norberto Behmann Dell'Elmo		Aldo Moro	Haxhi Lleshi	
September 2, 1969	Roberto Venturini		Mariano Rumor	Haxhi Lleshi	
March 19, 1974	Renato Ferrara		Mariano Rumor	Haxhi Lleshi	
July 29, 1976	Giovanni Saragat		Aldo Moro	Haxhi Lleshi	
September 21, 1978	Giovanni Paolo Tozzoli		Giulio Andreotti	Haxhi Lleshi	
September 9, 1981	Francesco Carlo Gentile		Giovanni Spadolini	Haxhi Lleshi	
January 6, 1988	Giorgio De Andreis		Giovanni Goria	Ramiz Alia	
February 16, 1991	Torquato Cardilli		Giulio Andreotti	Ramiz Alia	1997
March 12, 1993	Paolo Foresti		Giuliano Amato	Sali Berisha	
June 12, 1997	Marcello Spatafora		Romano Prodi	Rexhep Meidani	1999
October 3, 1999	Mario Salvator Bova	1945 Juli	Massimo D’Alema	Rexhep Meidani	2003
May 10, 2003	Attilio Massimo Innucci	10|1947	Silvio Berlusconi	Alfred Moisiu	2007
September 18, 2007	Saba D'Elia	(*February 6, 1948 in Naples) Albania a Nola (Napoli) il 6 febbraio 1948, l'Ambasciatore Saba D'Elia si è laureato in Scienze Politiche il 22 novembre 1971 presso l'Università di Roma. Ha presentato il 3 ottobre 2007 le credenziali al Presidente della Repubblica d'Albania Bamir Topi	Romano Prodi	Bamir Topi	
December 5, 2011	Massimo Gaiani	(*May 28, 1956 in Addis Abeba	Silvio Berlusconi	Bamir Topi	
November 16, 2015	Alberto Cutillo	born in Naples	Matteo Renzi	Bujar Nishani	
January 8, 2020	Fabrizio Bucci		Giuseppe Conte	Ilir Meta	2022
