= Francesco Maria Taliani de Marchio =

Italian Ambassador to China
- In office 1938–1946
- Monarch: Victor Emmanuel III
- Prime Minister: Benito Mussolini
- Preceded by: Giuliano Cora
- Succeeded by: Sergio Fenoaltea

Italian Ambassador to Spain
- In office 1951–1952
- President: Luigi Einaudi
- Prime Minister: Alcide De Gasperi
- Preceded by: Francesco Paolo Vanni d'Archirafi
- Succeeded by: Alberto Rossi Longhi

Personal details
- Born: Francesco Maria Taliani de Marchio; October 22, 1887 Ascoli Piceno, Kingdom of Italy
- Died: March 16, 1968 (aged 80) Roma
- Spouse: Archduchess Margaretha of Austria (m. 1937)
- Education: Sapienza University of Rome
- Profession: Diplomat

Francesco Maria Taliani de Marchio (22 October 1887 – 16 March 1968) was an Italian diplomat who was most notable for his role as ambassador to China (1938–1946) during World War II. In this capacity he was accredited to the Japanese puppet state of the Reorganized National Government of China, under Wang Jingwei. In 1943, he refused to pledge loyalty to the Italian Social Republic and was briefly imprisoned by the Japanese. After the war he subsequently was made first Italian ambassador to Spain (1951–1952) since the countries broke relations in 1946. Taliani was married to Archduchess Margaretha of Austria.

== Biography ==
=== Early career ===
He was born in Ascoli Piceno in 1887. After studying law at the Sapienza University of Rome in 1910 he entered the foreign minister and was first posted to Berlin in 1912, before being transferred to Constantinople in 1913. There Taliani helped protect Italian citizens in the Ottoman Empire and spent the early part of World War I. In 1916 was transferred to the Italian embassy in Petrograd, Russian Empire, throughout the October Revolution until 1919. Taliani then worked at the foreign minister's office before being posted in London from 1921 to 1923, and then returning to Constantinople until 1928. Back in Rome he was appointed the head of the ceremonial office. In 1932 Taliani was at The Hague and in 1938 he was made head of the Italian diplomatic mission in the Republic of China. Initially he was accredited as the ambassador to Chiang Kai-shek's Nationalist government in the early stages of the Second Sino-Japanese War, which was later forced to move to Chongqing as Nanjing, the capital, fell to the advancing Japanese forces.

Taliani was married to Archduchess Margaretha of Austria (a member of the House of Habsburg) on 27 November 1937, and she accompanied him to China, becoming imprisoned with him in 1943. The couple had no children.

=== Ambassador to China ===
However, in 1941 Benito Mussolini recognized the Japanese puppet state, the Reorganized National Government of China under Wang Jingwei in occupied Nanjing, so Taliani presented his credentials to him. Taliani had met Wang many times in Shanghai and reported that he was encountering many difficulties with Japan in setting up his government. Mussolini expected Japan to draw British forces away from the Mediterranean region, and so from 1941 to the fall of Mussolini's regime in 1943 Italian policy towards China revolved around exerting pressure on Japan to give greater autonomy to the Wang Jingwei government. Ambassador Taliani sent regular reports to foreign minister Count Galeazzo Ciano regarding the situation in occupied China. Throughout 1941 and early 1942, Taliani informed his government about his conversations with Wang Jingwei (as well as with Japanese diplomatic contacts in Shanghai) in which the Chinese politician spoke to him about his lack of power and the strict limits the Japanese put on his administration, and the increasing pessimism among his supporters. He also told Taliani that Japan was still considering establishing peace with Chiang Kai-shek and a plan being considered by the Japanese military would take away even what little powers Wang Jingwei did have, turning it into an organ of the military administration. This caused the Italian government to increase its attempts at making Japan grant the Nanjing regime more authority.

But in 1943 with the establishment of the Italian Social Republic, Taliani refused to pledge allegiance to the new regime, so the Japanese imprisoned him until the surrender of Japan in August 1945. In 1945 he was confirmed Italian ambassador to China, a post he held until 1946 when he returned to Italy. During his time in China, he became a collector of Chinese antiques, and obtained several from the Ming Dynasty era.

=== Ambassador to Spain ===
In 1951, Taliani became the first Italian ambassador to be appointed to Spain since Italy broke off relations with the Falange government in 1946. Taliani met with Francisco Franco and the two discussed both the restoration of Italian–Spanish relations as well as the international situation, particularly in regards to Spain joining NATO. In his position he continued to play an important role in the reestablishment of relations between the two countries. He was replaced as ambassador in 1952 and forced into retirement.

=== Later life ===
Taliani went on to publish multiple books throughout his life, most of them dealing with his experiences throughout his diplomatic career, including He Died in China, Italy and Spain, Postwar in Shanghai, and Petersburg 1917: Memories of an embassy secretary at the Italian embassy in Russia, 1917–1918. The former ambassador died in 1968.

== Publications ==
- Pietrogrado, 1917, Arnoldo Mondadori Editore, Verona, 1935.
- Petersburg 1917: herinneringen van een gezantschaps-secretaris in dienst bij de Italiaansche ambassade in Rusland in de jaren 1917 en 1918, Van Kampen & Zoon, Amsterdam, 1936.
- Vita del Cardinal Gasparri. Segretario di Stato e povero prete, Arnoldo Mondadori Editore, Verona, 1938.
- È morto in Cina, Arnoldo Mondadori Editore, Verona, 1949.
- Muriò en China, Sucesores de Rivadeneyra, Madrid, 1952.
- Vida del Cardenal Gasparri, Editora Nacional, Madrid, 1952.
- Dopoguerra a Shangai, Garzanti, Milano, 1958.
- Veli stracciati, Arnoldo Mondadori Editore, Milano, 1966.

== Honors ==
Order of Merit of the Italian Republic 1st Class / Knight Grand Cross – December 30, 1952

== See also ==
- Ministry of Foreign Affairs (Italy)
- Foreign relations of Italy

== Sources ==
=== Books ===
- Beretta, Silvio; Berkofsky, Axel; Zhang, Lihong, eds. (2017). Understanding China Today. Springer. ISBN 978-3319296241.
- Brady, Anne-Marie; Brown, Douglas, eds. (2012). Foreigners and Foreign Institutions in Republican China. Routledge. ISBN 978-0415528658.
- Hamann, Brigitte (1988). The Habsburgs: A Biographical Dictionary (in German). Ueberreuter. ISBN 3800032473.
- Hierro Lecea, Pablo Del (2015). Spanish-Italian Relations and the Influence of the Major Powers, 1943–1957. Palgrave Macmillan. ISBN 978-1349496549.
- McIntosh, David (2000). The Unknown Habsburgs. Rosvall Royal Books. ISBN 91-973978-0-6.

Diplomatic posts
Preceded by Giuliano Cora	Italian Ambassador to China (Nanjing regime, 1941–1943); 1938–1946	Succeeded by Sergio Fenoaltea
Preceded by Francesco Paolo Vanni d'Archirafi	Italian Ambassador to Spain; 1951–1952	Succeeded by Alberto Rossi Longhi
