= List of ambassadors of Italy to China =

Ambassador of Italy to China
- Emblem of Italy
- Incumbent; Massimo Ambrosetti since May 17, 2023
- Inaugural holder: Vittorio Sallier De La Tour
- Formation: 1866

The Italian ambassador to China is the head of the Italian diplomatic mission in China, the official representative of the Government in Rome to the Government of China.

== List of representatives ==
Term start	Head of mission	Observations	List of prime ministers of Italy	List of heads of state of China	Term end
March 13, 1867	Vittorio Sallier De La Tour		Bettino Ricasoli	Cixi	1870
March 7, 1870	Alessandro Fe' d'Ostiani		Giovanni Lanza	Cixi	1877
February 22, 1877	Raffaele Ulisse Barbolani		Agostino Depretis	Cixi	1878
December 12, 1878	Ferdinando de Luca		Benedetto Cairoli	Cixi	1889
December 5, 1889	Alberto Pansa		Francesco Crispi	Guangxu	1894
February 6, 1894	Alessandro Bardi		Francesco Crispi	Guangxu	1896
March 6, 1898	Renato De Martino		Antonio di Rudinì	Guangxu	1899
March 23, 1899	Giuseppe Salvago Raggi		Luigi Pelloux	Cixi	1901
December 19, 1901	Giovanni Gallina		Giuseppe Zanardelli	Cixi	1904
July 11, 1904	Carlo Baroli		Giovanni Giolitti	Cixi	1906
November 3, 1907	Giulio Cesare Vinci		Giovanni Giolitti	Cixi	1910
March 3, 1910	Federico Barilari		Sidney Sonnino	Puyi	1911
May 11, 1911	Carlo Sforza		Giovanni Giolitti	Puyi	1915
September 1, 1916	Carlo Aliotti		Antonio Salandra	Yuan Shikai	1919
January 6, 1919	Carlo Garbasso		Vittorio Emanuele Orlando	Xu Shichang	1919
May 27, 1920	Carlo Durazzo		Francesco Saverio Nitti	Xu Shichang	1921
September 28, 1922	Vittorio Cerruti		Luigi Facta	Li Yuanhong	1926
February 6, 1927	Daniele Varè		Benito Mussolini	Wellington Koo	1931
May 26, 1932	Galeazzo Ciano		Benito Mussolini	Lin Sen	1933
September 19, 1933	Raffaele Boscarelli		Benito Mussolini	Lin Sen	1934
December 6, 1934	Vincenzo Lojacono		Benito Mussolini	Lin Sen	1937
January 4, 1937	Giuliano Cora		Benito Mussolini	Lin Sen	1937
June 22, 1938	Francesco Maria Taliani de Marchio		Benito Mussolini	Lin Sen	1946
March 6, 1946	Sergio Fenoaltea		Alcide De Gasperi	Chiang Kai-shek	1949
1949	Ezio Mizzan	chargé d'affaires	Alcide De Gasperi	Chiang Kai-shek	1951
1951 – 1971
December 8, 1970	Antonino Restivo	chargé d'affaires	Emilio Colombo	Soong Ching-ling	1971
May 12, 1971	Folco Trabalza		Emilio Colombo	Zhu De	1975
September 4, 1975	Marco Francisci Di Baschi		Aldo Moro	Zhu De	1980
August 1, 1980	Giulio Tamagnini		Francesco Cossiga	Ye Jianying	1984
January 30, 1984	Raffaele Marras		Bettino Craxi	Li Xiannian	1987
February 1, 1987	Alberto Solera		Bettino Craxi	Li Xiannian	1990
February 28, 1990	Oliviero Rossi		Giulio Andreotti	Yang Shangkun	1994
April 23, 1994	Alessandro Quaroni		Carlo Azeglio Ciampi	Jiang Zemin	1998
September 17, 1998	Paolo Bruni		Romano Prodi	Jiang Zemin	2003
April 30, 2003	Gabriele Menegatti		Silvio Berlusconi	Hu Jintao	2006
December 11, 2006	Riccardo Sessa		Romano Prodi	Hu Jintao	2010
December 12, 2010	Attilio Massimo Iannucci		Silvio Berlusconi	Hu Jintao	2013
January 5, 2013	Alberto Bradanini		Mario Monti	Hu Jintao	2015
July 20, 2015	Ettore Francesco Sequi		Matteo Renzi	Xi Jinping	2019
January 2, 2020	Luca Ferrari		Giuseppe Conte	Xi Jinping	2022
May 17, 2023	Massimo Ambrosetti		Giorgia Meloni	Xi Jinping	incumbent
