= Paola Amadei =

Italian diplomat

Italian Ambassador to Iran
- Incumbent
- Assumed office 18 March 2024
- Preceded by: Giuseppe Perrone

Italian Ambassador to Bahrain
- In office 8 January 2020 – March 2024
- Preceded by: Domenico Bellato

Italian Ambassador to Oman
- In office 24 September 2012 – 2016
- Preceded by: Paolo Dionisi
- Succeeded by: Giorgio Visetti

Personal details
- Born: 15 July 1964 (age 62) Rome
- Education: Sapienza University of Rome

Paola Amadei is an Italian diplomat and ambassador of Italy to Iran since March 2024. She entered the diplomatic corps in 1992.

== Education ==
She graduated with Political Science with honors from the University of Rome La Sapienza in 1988. She had her master's degree in Advanced European Studies at the College of Europe in Bruges in 1992.

== Career ==
In her first foreign post, she was Deputy Head of Mission and Head of the Commercial Office at the Italian Embassy in Singapore from 1996 to 2000. Amadei was appointed as the Italian ambassador to Oman from 24 September 2012 – 1 March 2016. From June 2018 to January 2020, she was head of Cabinet to the Undersecretary for Foreign Affairs, Minister Plenipotentiary, Ministry of Foreign Affairs and International Cooperation in Rome. She was the Italian ambassador to the Kingdom of Bahrain from January 2020. Since March 2024 she is the ambassador of Italy to Iran.

== Honours ==
- Officer of the Order of Merit of the Italian Republic – December 27, 2007
- Al Noman Order, First Class, Sultanate of Oman

== See also ==
- List of ambassadors of Italy
- Ministry of Foreign Affairs (Italy)
- Foreign relations of Italy
