= Mario Scialoja =

Italian diplomat

Mario Scialoja (July 29, 1930 Rome, Italy - June 24, 2012) was an Italian diplomat. His last post was as Italian ambassador to Saudi Arabia from 1994 to 1996. Upon retiring, he decided to spend his last years serving the Muslim community of Italy.

In 1998, Scialoja promoted the opening in Rome of a branch of the Muslim World League, a Saudi NGO with its central headquarters in Mecca. He occupied the position of Vice President and Director General from 1998 to 2006, and, after resigning, remained a member of the group's Constitutive Committee. Subsequently, he was a member of the Consultative Commission for Italian Islam in the Ministry of the Interior, and Counselor of Administration of the Islamic Cultural Centre of Italy, the only Islamic institution officially recognized in Italy by a decree of the President of the Republic.

Scialoja converted to Islam at the end of 1988, when he was Deputy Permanent Representative of Italy to the United Nations.

== See also ==
- Torquato Cardilli
