= List of ambassadors of Italy to Belgium =

Ambassador of Italy to Belgium
- L'ambasciatore italiano a Bruxelles
- Emblem of Italy
- Incumbent; Federica Favi since January 27, 2023
- Inaugural holder: Antonio Napolitano
- Formation: 1851

The Ambassador of Italy in Belgium (in French: ambassadeur d'Italie en Belgique, in Dutch: ambassadeur van Italië in België) is the head of the diplomatic mission of the Italian Republic in the Kingdom of Belgium. The current ambassador, in charge since 27 January 2023 the ambassador of Italy in Belgium is Federica Favi.

== List ==
| From | To | Ambassador |
|---|---|---|
| 1851 | 1866 | Alberto Lupi di Montalto |
| 1866 | 1867 | Rodrigo Doria di Prelà |
| 1867 | 1871 | Giulio Camillo De Barral de Monteauvrand |
| 1871 | 1876 | Alberto Blanc |
| 1876 | 1880 | Giulio Camillo De Barral de Monteauvrand |
| 1880 | 1887 | Alessandro Fè d'Ostiani |
| 1887 | 1889 | Enrico Della Croce di Dojola |
| 1889 | 1890 | Francesco De Renzis |
| 1890 | 1895 | Carlo Alberto Ferdinando Maffei di Boglio |
| 1895 | 1903 | Romeo Cantagalli |
| 1903 | 1904 | Carlo Alberto Gerbaix de Sonnaz |
| 1904 | 1910 | Lelio Bonin Longare |
| 1910 | 1914 | Francesco Bottaro-Costa |
| 1914 | 1919 | Francesco Carignani di Novoli |
| 1919 | 1924 | Mario Ruspoli di Poggio Suasa |
| 1924 | 1925 | Luca Orsini Baroni |
| 1925 | 1928 | Lazzaro Negrotto Cambiaso |
| 1928 | 1931 | Carlo Durazzo |
| 1931 | 1932 | Alberto Martin Franklin |
| 1932 | 1936 | Luigi Vannutelli Rey |
| 1936 | 1939 | Gabriele Preziosi |
| 1939 | 1940 | Vincenzo Lojacono |
| 1940 | 1947 | Giacomo Paulucci di Calboli |
| 1947 | 1948 | Rino De Nobili di Vezzano |
| 1948 | 1952 | Pasquale Diana |
| 1952 | 1954 | Umberto Grazzi |
| 1954 | 1958 | Michele Scammacca del Murgo e dell'Agnone |
| 1958 | 1961 | Sergio Fenoaltea |
| 1961 | 1962 | Pellegrino Ghigi |
| 1962 | 1965 | Alberico Casardi |
| 1965 | 1971 | Aldo Maria Mazio |
| 1971 | 1975 | Girolamo Pignatti Morano di Custoza |
| 1975 | 1978 | Giacomo Trabalza |
| 1978 | 1981 | Fernando Natale |
| 1981 | 1985 | Alberto Cavaglieri |
| 1985 | 1992 | Giovanni Saragat |
| 1992 | 1994 | Emanuele Scammacca del Murgo e dell'Agnone |
| 1994 | 1999 | Francesco Corrias |
| 1999 | 2003 | Gaetano Cortese |
| 2003 | 2006 | Massimo Macchia |
| 2006 | 2010 | Sandro Maria Siggia |
| 2010 | 2012 | Roberto Bettarini |
| 2013 | 2015 | Alfredo Bastianelli |
| 2015 | 2017 | Vincenzo Grassi |
| 2017 | 2021 | Elena Basile |
| 2021 | 2022 | Francesco Genuardi |
| 2023 | In charge | Federica Favi |
