= Giancarlo Aragona =

Italian diplomat

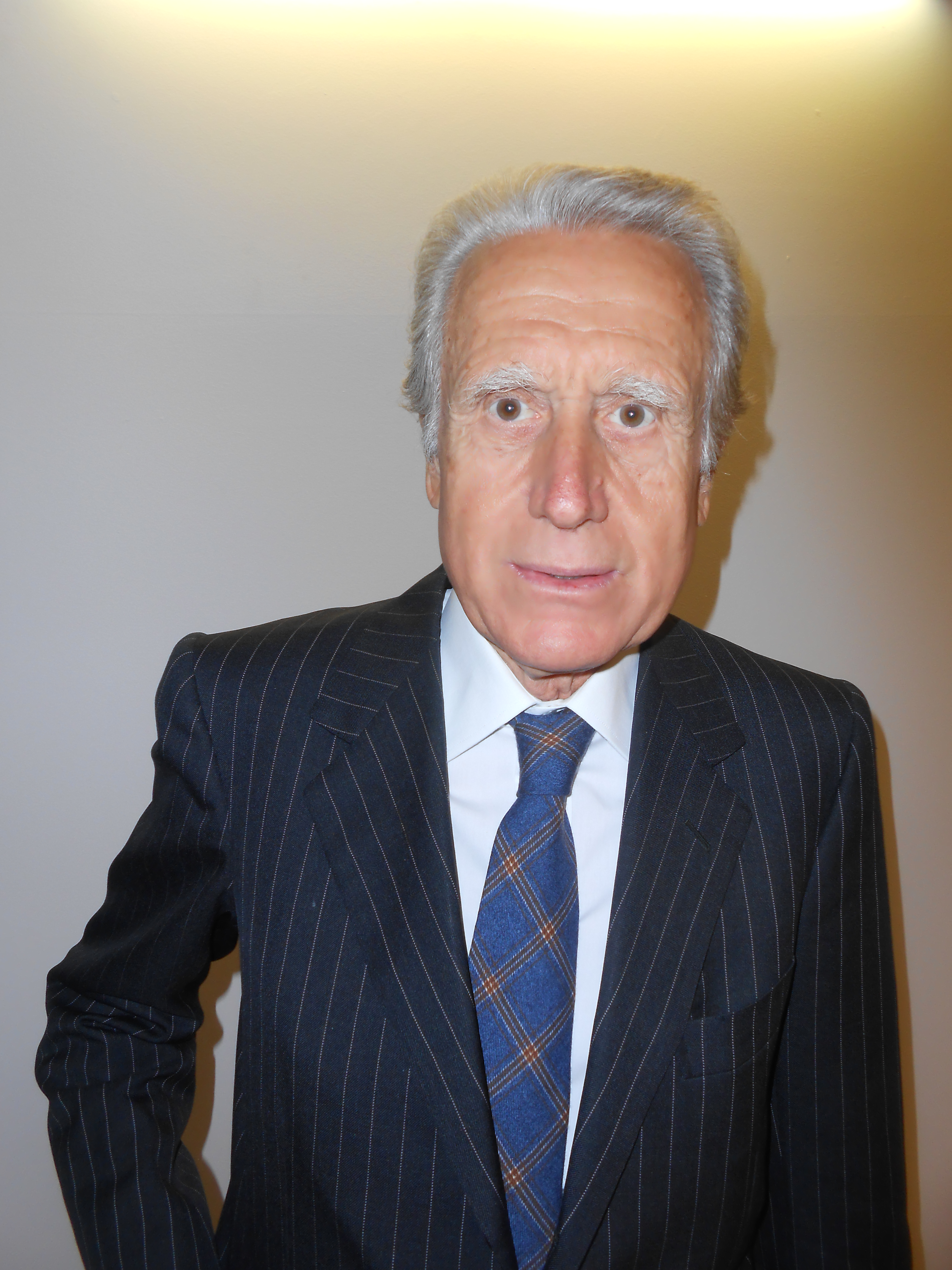

Secretary General of the Organization for Security and Co-operation in Europe
- In office 1996–1999
- Preceded by: Wilhelm Höynck
- Succeeded by: Ján Kubiš

Ambassador of Italy to Russia
- In office 1999–2001
- Preceded by: Emanuele Scammacca del Murgo e dell'Agnone
- Succeeded by: Gianfranco Facco Bonetti

Ambassador of Italy to the United Kingdom
- In office 2005–2010
- Preceded by: Paolo Galli
- Succeeded by: Alain Giorgio Maria Economides

Personal details
- Born: November 14, 1942 (age 83) Messina
- Education: University of Messina
- Profession: Diplomat

Giancarlo Aragona (born November 14, 1942) is an Italian diplomat who served as ambassador of Italy to NATO, Russia and United Kingdom and Secretary General of OSCE.

== Biography ==
Aragona was born in Messina on November 14, 1942, and holds a law degree from the University of Messina in 1964 and entered the diplomatic career in 1969.

== Diplomatic career ==
In 1972 he was appointed second secretary at the Vienna Permanent Mission as press secretary; two years later he became Consul in Freiburg im Breisgau, and from 1977 to 1980 he was Counselor in Lagos. Returning to Rome in 1980, he worked in the Africa Office of the Directorate General for Political Affairs of the Ministry of Foreign Affairs; in 1982 he headed the Mediterranean and Middle East Office of the Directorate General for Development Cooperation, and two years later became the first political counselor at the Italian Embassy in London.

In 1987 he was transferred to the Italian Permanent Representation of the Atlantic Council (NATO) in Brussels. Returning again to Rome, he was appointed diplomatic adviser to the Ministry of Defense in 1992. In 1994 he returned to the Ministry of Foreign Affairs in the Minister's Cabinet, which he headed the following year. In 1996 he became Secretary General of the Organization for Security and Cooperation in Europe (OSCE) in Vienna, serving a three-year term. He was later appointed Ambassador to Moscow, and in 2001 he was appointed Director General of Political Affairs of the Italian Ministry of Foreign Affairs. In 2004 he became the Ambassador of Italy in London.

He ended his diplomatic career in 2009 due to age limit, and was called by NATO among the experts in charge of preparing a proposal for reforming the Atlantic Alliance. From 2010 to 2013 he was president of the Società Gestione Impianti Nucleari (SOGIN). From November 15, 2011, to December 31, 2016, he was president of the Istituto per gli studi di politica internazionale (ISPI) after the passing of Boris Biancheri, and is now a member of ISPI Scientific Committee. As of Jan. 1, 2012, he is vice president of the Science for Peace world conference, which is held annually at Bocconi University in Milan.

== Honours ==
Order of Merit of the Italian Republic 1st Class / Knight Grand Cross – June 2, 2007

== See also ==
- Ministry of Foreign Affairs (Italy)
- Foreign relations of Italy
