= List of ambassadors of Italy to OSCE =

Ambassador of Italy to OSCE
- Emblem of Italy
- Incumbent; Stefano Baldi since 2021
- Style: His Excellency
- Inaugural holder: Mario Sica
- Formation: 1993

The Italian ambassador to OSCE is the ambassador of the Italian Government to the Organisation for the Cooperation and Security in Europe in Vienna.

== List of representatives ==
Diplomatic accreditation	Ambassador	Observations	List of prime ministers of Italy	List of Secretary General of OSCE	Term end
1993	Mario Sica		Giuliano Amato	Wilhelm Höynck	1997
1997	Carlo Civiletti		Romano Prodi	Giancarlo Aragona	2000
2000	Guido Lenzi		Massimo D'Alema	Ján Kubiš	2004
2004	Francesco Bascone		Silvio Berlusconi	Ján Kubiš	2008
2008	Gianfranco Varvesi		Romano Prodi	Marc Perrin de Brichambaut	2011
2011	Giulio Tonini		Silvio Berlusconi	Lamberto Zannier	2013
2013	Vittorio Rocco di Torrepadula		Mario Monti	Lamberto Zannier	2016
2016	Alessandro Azzoni		Matteo Renzi	Thomas Greminger	2020
2021	Stefano Baldi		Giuseppe Conte	Helga Schmid	

== See also ==
- List of diplomatic missions of Italy
- List of ambassadors of Italy
