= List of ambassadors of Italy to Belarus =

Ambassador of Italy to Belarus
- L'ambasciatore italiano a Minsk
- Emblem of Italy
- Incumbent; Norberto Cappello since June 26, 2018
- Inaugural holder: Gian Luca Bertinetto
- Formation: May 28, 1992

The Ambassador of Italy in Belarus (in Belarusian, Пасол Італіі ў Беларусі) is the head of the diplomatic mission of the Italian Republic in the Republic of Belarus. The current ambassador in charge since April 26, 2018 is Norberto Cappello.

== History ==
Italy and Belarus began diplomatic relations following independence on July 27, 1990. Relations between the two nations are established in the protocol for the establishment of diplomatic relations signed on April 13, 1992, by the foreign ministers of the two countries, Pëtr Kravčenko and Gianni De Michelis, during his first official visit to Italy by a Belarusian government delegation led by the Prime Minister Vjačaslaŭ Kebič.

In May 1992 the embassy in Minsk was opened and Gian Luca Bertinetto was the first ambassador.

== List ==
The following is a list of Italian ambassadors to Belarus.

Period	Title	Ambassador	Embassy	Appointed by	Accredited by	Note
May 28, 1992: November 10, 1996	Ambassador Extraordinary and Plenipotentiary	Guglielmo Ardizzone	Minsk	Andreotti VI Cabinet	Aljaksandr Lukašėnka	
March 17, 1997: January 21, 2001	Ambassador Extraordinary and Plenipotentiary	Arnaldo Abeti	Minsk	Prodi I Cabinet	Aljaksandr Lukašėnka	
January 22, 2001: June 5, 2003	Ambassador Extraordinary and Plenipotentiary	Giovanni Ceruti	Minsk	Amato II Cabinet	Aljaksandr Lukašėnka	
July 1, 2003: August 21, 2007	Ambassador Extraordinary and Plenipotentiary	Stefano Benazzo	Minsk	Berlusconi II Cabinet	Aljaksandr Lukašėnka	
August 30, 2007: August 14, 2010	Ambassador Extraordinary and Plenipotentiary	Stefano Bianchi	Minsk	Prodi II Cabinet	Aljaksandr Lukašėnka	
August 14, 2010: December 23, 2013	Ambassador Extraordinary and Plenipotentiary	Mario Giorgio Stefano Baldi	Minsk	Berlusconi IV Cabinet	Aljaksandr Lukašėnka	
December 23, 2013: April 26, 2018	Ambassador Extraordinary and Plenipotentiary	Gian Luca Bertinetto †	Minsk	Letta Cabinet	Aljaksandr Lukašėnka	
April 26, 2018 - In charge	Ambassador Extraordinary and Plenipotentiary	Norberto Cappello	Minsk	Gentiloni Cabinet	Aljaksandr Lukašėnka	
