= List of ambassadors of Italy to Saudi Arabia =

Coordinates: 24.685202°N 46.628873°E

Ambassador of Italy to Saudi Arabia
- L'ambasciatore italiano a Riad
- Emblem of Italy
- Incumbent; Roberto Cantone since June 2, 2020
- Inaugural holder: Ottavio De Peppo
- Formation: May 26, 1932

The Italian ambassador in Riyadh is the official representative of the Government in Rome to the Government of Saudi Arabia.

Diplomatic accreditation	Ambassador	Title	Italian prime minister	King of Saudi Arabia	Term end
May 26, 1932	Ottavio De Peppo		Benito Mussolini	Ibn Saud	
November 24, 1933	Giovanni Persico	Chargé d'affaires	Benito Mussolini	Ibn Saud	
May 11, 1936	Giovanni Persico		Benito Mussolini	Ibn Saud	
February 18, 1837	Luigi Sillitti		Benito Mussolini	Ibn Saud	
June 14, 1940	Guglielmo Rulli		Benito Mussolini	Ibn Saud	
April 11, 1947	Filippo Zappi		Ferruccio Parri	Ibn Saud	
September 14, 1949	Ugo Turcato		Ferruccio Parri	Ibn Saud	
April 5, 1953	Giuseppe Capace Galeota della Regina		Giuseppe Pella	Saud of Saudi Arabia	
June 18, 1955	Alberto Brugnoli		Antonio Segni	Saud of Saudi Arabia	
August 2, 1958	Mario Alessandro Paulucci	Envoy	Amintore Fanfani	Saud of Saudi Arabia	
May 20, 1960	Mario Alessandro Paulucci	Ambassador	Fernando Tambroni	Saud of Saudi Arabia	
December 7, 1961	Dante Matacotta		Fernando Tambroni	Saud of Saudi Arabia	
October 31, 1966	Luigi Sabetta		Giovanni Leone	Faisal of Saudi Arabia	
October 28, 1971	Massimo Casilli D’Aragona		Emilio Colombo	Faisal of Saudi Arabia	
July 25, 1973	Alberto Ramasso Valacca		Mariano Rumor	Faisal of Saudi Arabia	
April 28, 1978	Alberto Solera		Giulio Andreotti	Khalid of Saudi Arabia	
May 10, 1981	Marcello Salimei		Giovanni Spadolini	Khalid of Saudi Arabia	
January 11, 1986	Francesco Ripandelli		Bettino Craxi	Fahd of Saudi Arabia	
April 8, 1989	Mario Emanuele Maiolini		Giulio Andreotti	Fahd of Saudi Arabia	
July 7, 1994	Mario Scialoja		Silvio Berlusconi	Fahd of Saudi Arabia	
November 1, 1996	Marco Sorace Maresca		Romano Prodi	Fahd of Saudi Arabia	
November 7, 2000	Torquato Cardilli		Giuliano Amato	Fahd of Saudi Arabia	
June 15, 2003	Armando Sanguini		Silvio Berlusconi	Fahd of Saudi Arabia	
November 15, 2005	Eugenio d’Auria		Silvio Berlusconi	Abdullah of Saudi Arabia	
July 19, 2010	Valentino Simonetti		Silvio Berlusconi	Abdullah of Saudi Arabia	
February 5, 2013	Mario Boffo		Enrico Letta	Abdullah of Saudi Arabia	
March 7, 2016	Luca Ferrari (ambassador)		Matteo Renzi	Salman of Saudi Arabia	
June 2, 2020	Roberto Cantone		Giuseppe Conte	Salman of Saudi Arabia	
