= List of ambassadors of Italy to Bolivia =

Coordinates: 16.524637°S 68.110157°W

Ambassador of Italy to the Bolivia
- Ambasciatore d'Italia in Bolivia
- Emblem of Italy
- Inaugural holder: Antonio Maria Migliorati
- Formation: 25 May 1864

The Italian ambassador in La Paz is the official representative of the Government in Rome to the Government of Bolivia.

== List of representatives ==
Diplomatic accreditation	Ambassador	Observations	List of prime ministers of Italy	President of Bolivia	Term end
25 May 1864	Marchese Antonio Maria Migliorati	Minister residentThe Marquis Antonio Maria Migliorati (1825-1898) was an extraordinary envoy and minister plenipotentiary of the Kingdom of Italy in Athens. In 1876 he will be appointed senator.	Alfonso Ferrero La Marmora	Mariano Melgarejo	
31 December 1866	Barone Carlo Alberto Cavalchini-Garofoli	Minister resident extraordinary envoy and plenipotentiary.: 3 April 1868: minister in Rio de Janeiro.	Marco Minghetti	Mariano Melgarejo	
30 June 1867	Ippolito Garrou	General Consul: 1 October 1870: Consul General en Santiago de Chile	Urbano Rattazzi	Mariano Melgarejo	
20 December 1875	Giovanni Battista Viviani	General Consul1876-1882 envoy to Peru	Marco Minghetti	Tomás Frías Ametller	
16 July 1884	Enrico De Gubernatis	General Consul: 1881: Italian consul in the course of the Turkish-Greek border	Agostino Depretis	Gregorio Pacheco Leyes	
30 July 1888	David Segre	Consul	Francesco Crispi	Aniceto Arce Ruiz	
22 December 1895	conte Alessandro De Rege di Donato	Consul: In 1896 he was ministerresident in Bogotá.	Francesco Crispi	Mariano Baptista Caserta	
16 April 1896	Pietro Giuseppe Castelli	Consul	Antonio Starabba, Marchese di Rudinì	Severo Fernandez Alonso Caballero	
24 February 1899	Giuseppe Pirrone (Italian diplomat)	General Consul: 1911: Ministro residente di S. M. il Re d'Italia a Bogotà.	Luigi Pelloux	José Manuel Pando	
11 September 1904	Tommaso Carletti	Consul (1860- 1919): console italiano a Gerusalemme	Giovanni Giolitti	Ismael Montes Gamboa	
23 February 1908	conte Francesco Mazza	General Consul	Sidney Sonnino	Ismael Montes Gamboa	
3 April 1910	Ruffillo Agnoli	Envoy Extraordinary and Minister Plenipotentiary	Luigi Luzzatti	Eliodoro Villazón Montaño	
27 July 1924	Fortunato Castoldi	Envoy Extraordinary and Minister Plenipotentiary	Benito Mussolini	Bautista Saavedra Mallea	
6 August 1926	Ugo Cafiero	Chargé d'affaires (1866 – 1951)	Benito Mussolini	Hernando Siles Reyes	
24 January 1929	Ugo Cafiero	Envoy Extraordinary and Minister Plenipotentiary	Benito Mussolini	Hernando Siles Reyes	
1 May 1933	Bruno Gemelli	Envoy Extraordinary and Minister Plenipotentiary1936 italienischer Generalkonsul in Zürich	Benito Mussolini	Daniel Salamanca Urey	
15 January 1934	Piero Toni	Chargé d'affairesComendatore Piero Toni presented his credentials on 8 October 1938. About 45 years of age, rather self-important, he was, before the outbreak of war, very friendly towards this legation. Nevertheless, he antagonised many of his	Benito Mussolini	José Luis Tejada Sorzano	
14 August 1936	Luigi Mariani	Envoy Extraordinary and Minister Plenipotentiary	Benito Mussolini	David Toro	
22 December 1945	Alfonso Errera	Envoy Extraordinary and Minister Plenipotentiary(*1892)	Ferruccio Parri	Gualberto Villarroel López	
30 May 1947	Renato Giardini	Envoy Extraordinary and Minister Plenipotentiary: In 1938 he was Chargé d'Affaires in Bagdad.	Ferruccio Parri	Enrique Hertzog	
27 October 1951	Luigi Nardi		Ferruccio Parri	Hugo Ballivián Rojas	
9 February 1955	Leone Sircana		Antonio Segni	Hernán Siles Zuazo	
18 November 1957	Mario Tommasini		Adone Zoli	Hernán Siles Zuazo	
25 June 1959	Pio Riccardo Jannuzzi		Antonio Segni	Hernán Siles Zuazo	
27 March 1965	Pietro Quirino Tortorici		Giovanni Leone	Alfredo Ovando Candia	
22 December 1970	Gian Pietro Nuti		Emilio Colombo	Juan Torres Gonzáles	
3 July 1973	Beniamino Del Giudice		Mariano Rumor	Hugo Banzer Suárez	
14 March 1975	Sergio Kociancich		Aldo Moro	Hugo Banzer Suárez	
27 September 1978	Giorgio Bosco		Giulio Andreotti	Juan Pereda Asbún	
13 November 1982	Alessandro Merola	Chargé d'affaires	Amintore Fanfani	Guido Vildoso Calderón	
9 December 1982	Luchino Cortese		Amintore Fanfani	Guido Vildoso Calderón	
24 February 1987	Giovanni Mingazzini (Italian diplomat)		Amintore Fanfani	Víctor Paz Estenssoro	
11 February 1992	Antonio Venturella		Giuliano Amato	Jaime Paz Zamora	
16 August 1995	Enric’Angelo Ferroni Carli		Lamberto Dini	Gonzalo Sánchez de Lozada	
15 October 1999	Eugenio Campo		Massimo D’Alema	Hugo Banzer Suárez	
4 December 2002	Maurizio Zanini		Silvio Berlusconi	Gonzalo Sánchez de Lozada	
30 January 2007	Silvio Mignano		Romano Prodi	Evo Morales	
17 November 2010	Luigi De Chiara		Silvio Berlusconi	Evo Morales	
13 October 2014	Placido Vigo		Matteo Renzi	Evo Morales	
10 June 2019	Francesco Tafuri		Giuseppe Conte	Evo Morales	2021
