= List of ambassadors of Italy to Malta =

Coordinates: 35.891688°N 14.507934°E

Ambassador of Italy to Malta
- Emblem of Italy
- Incumbent; Mario Sammartino since 18 September 2017
- Inaugural holder: Antonio Dazzi
- Formation: 1964

The Italian ambassador in Valletta is the official representative of the Government in Rome to the Government of Malta.

== List of representatives ==
Diplomatic accreditation	Ambassador	Observations	Notes	Prime ministers of Italy	Prime ministers of Malta	Term end
1964	Antonio Dazzi	Born in Unterschlatt on 13 June 1905. Died 1 September 1980. Bachelor's degree in law; diplomatic.		Giovanni Leone	George Borg Olivier	1970
1970	Guido Soro			Emilio Colombo	George Borg Olivier	1971
1971	Enrico Giglioli			Emilio Colombo	George Borg Olivier	1973
1973	Romualdo Massa Bernucci			Mariano Rumor	Dom Mintoff	1975
1975	Eric da Rin			Aldo Moro	Dom Mintoff	1978
1979	Maurizio Battaglini			Francesco Cossiga	Dom Mintoff	1983
1983	Andrea Negrotto Cambiaso			Bettino Craxi	Dom Mintoff	1986
1986	Marcello Spatafora			Bettino Craxi	Karmenu Mifsud Bonnici	1989
1989	Gian Paolo Tozzoli			Giulio Andreotti	Karmenu Mifsud Bonnici	1991
1991	Marino Fleri			Giulio Andreotti	Eddie Fenech Adami	1993
1993	Marco Colombo			Carlo Azeglio Ciampi	Eddie Fenech Adami	1998
1998	Giancarlo Riccio			Massimo D’Alema	Eddie Fenech Adami	2002
2002	Alvise Memmo			Silvio Berlusconi	Eddie Fenech Adami	2006
2006	Paolo Andrea Trabalza			Romano Prodi	Lawrence Gonzi	2010
2010	Efisio Luigi Marras			Silvio Berlusconi	Lawrence Gonzi	2013
February 21, 2013	Giovanni Umberto De Vito			Mario Monti	Lawrence Gonzi	2017
September 18, 2017	Mario Sammartino			Paolo Gentiloni	Joseph Muscat	
