= Julia Emma Villatoro Tario =

El Salvador's ambassador to the European Union

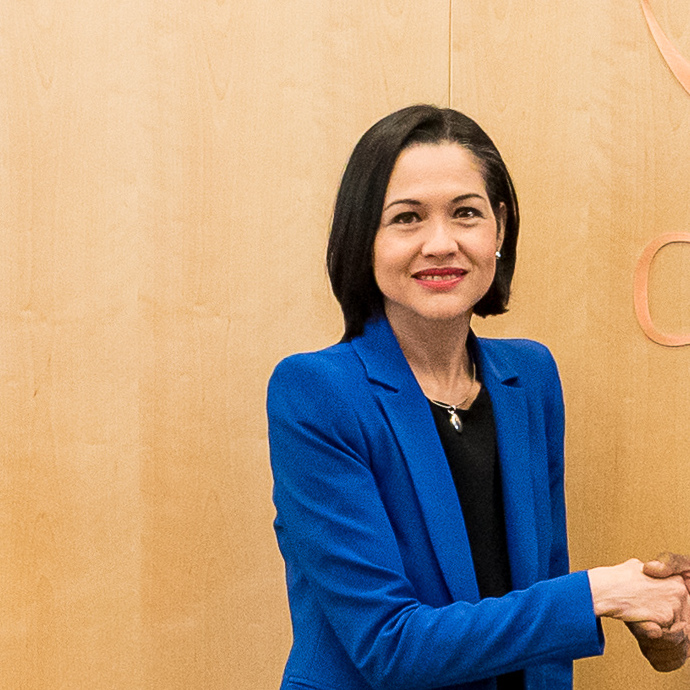
- Julia Emma Villatoro Tario
- Born: 23 October 1972; San Salvador
- Died: 30 July 2025 (aged 52); Vienna, Austria
- Education: Central American University
- Occupation: Diplomat
- Known for: Ambassador to Austria

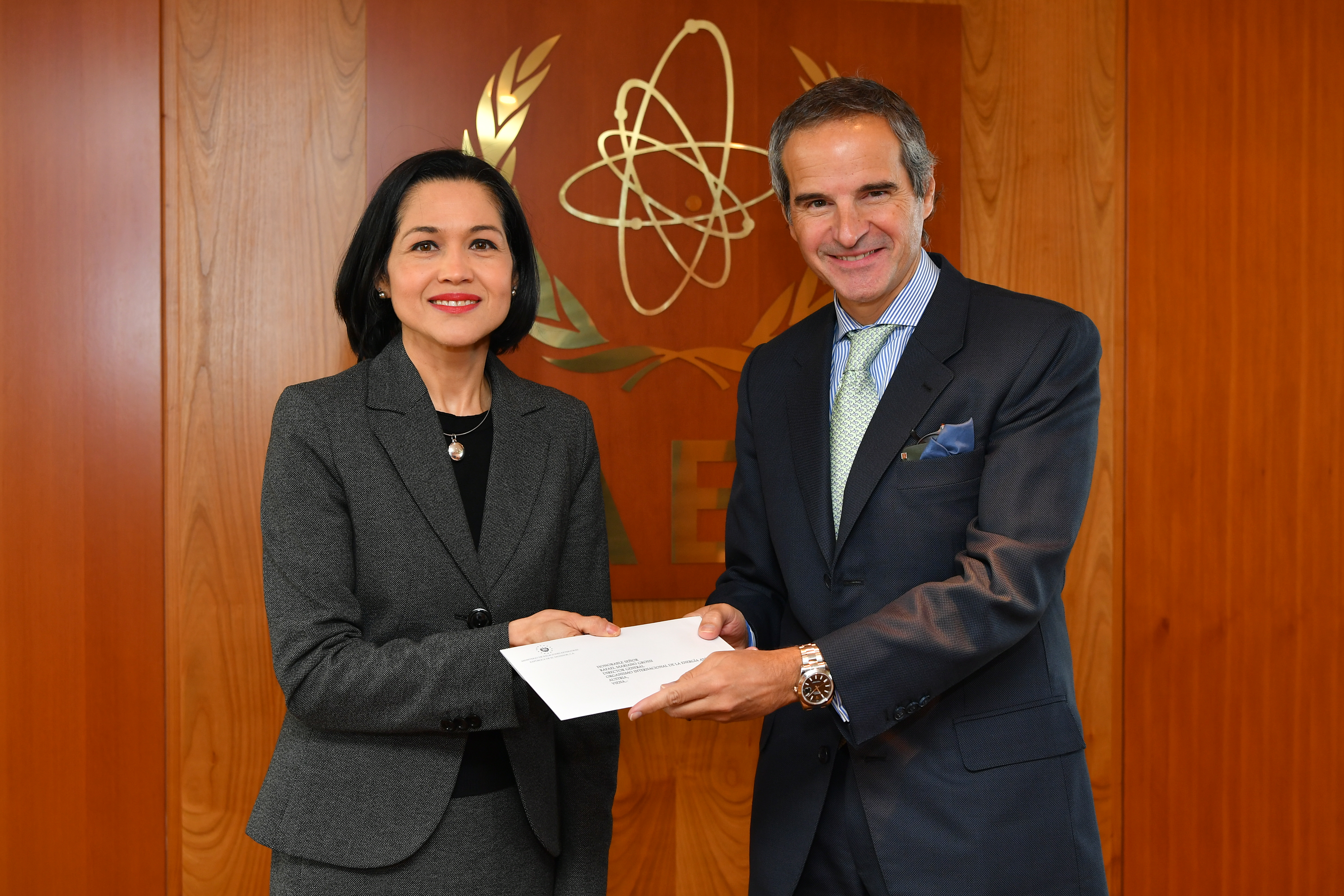
Julia Emma Villatoro Tario (01410883)

Julia Emma Villatoro Tario (born 1972) is a Salvadoran diplomat who was Ambassador of El Salvador to the Kingdom of Belgium, Head of Mission to the European Union and to the Grand Duchy of Luxembourg beginning in 2017. She was appointed as Chargée d'Affaires a.i. in June 2016. In 2020, she presented her credentials to Austrian Federal President Alexander Van der Bellen. She was also the Permanent Representative of El Salvador to the United Nations in Vienna.

== Life ==
Tario was born in 1972 in San Salvador.

She was authorised by the Supreme Court in El Salvador as an attorney after she graduated from the Central American University José Simeón Cañas. She joined her country's diplomatic service.

She was appointed as her country's ambassador to the European Union in January 2017. She was based at the embassy in Brussels.

On January 13, 2020, she presented her credentials to Austrian Federal President Alexander Van der Bellen. She is also the Permanent Representative of El Salvador to the United Nations in Vienna.

=== Professional career ===
Year	Position
1994-1998	Court Clerk and Judicial Officer, Second Family Court, San Salvador
1998-2005	Senior Legal Officer, Supreme Court of Justice, San Salvador
2005-2006	National Consultant for Secondary Legislation related to the creation of the Competition Superintendence and the implementation of the Competition Law, Presidential Commission for the Modernization of the Public Sector, San Salvador
2007	Expert Lawyer, Swiss Competition Commission, Bern
2006-2007	Senior Lawyer-Constitutional Chamber, Supreme Court of Justice, San Salvador
2007-2009	Chief of Legal and Investigation Division, Competition Authority, San Salvador
2009-2016	Deputy Permanent Representative, Minister Counsellor, Embassy in Austria and Permanent Mission to the United Nations and other International Organizations, Vienna
2016	Chargée d'Affaires, Minister Counsellor, Embassy in Brussels
2016-2020	Ambassador to Belgium and to Luxembourg and Head of Mission to the European Union, Brussels
2020-2025	Ambassador of the Republic of El Salvador to Austria

== Private life ==
In 2020 Tario was divorced with two children.
