= Rita Giuliana Mannella =

Italian diplomat

Ambassador Rita Giuliana Mannella

Personal details
- Born: Sulmona, L'Aquila, Italy
- Education: University of Pisa

Rita Giuliana Mannella is the Italian Ambassador to Sri Lanka having presented her credentials to President Maithripala Sirisena on December 3, 2018. She is also ambassador to the Maldives.

Mannella is a graduate of the University of Pisa.
