= Caterina Bertolini =

Italian diplomat

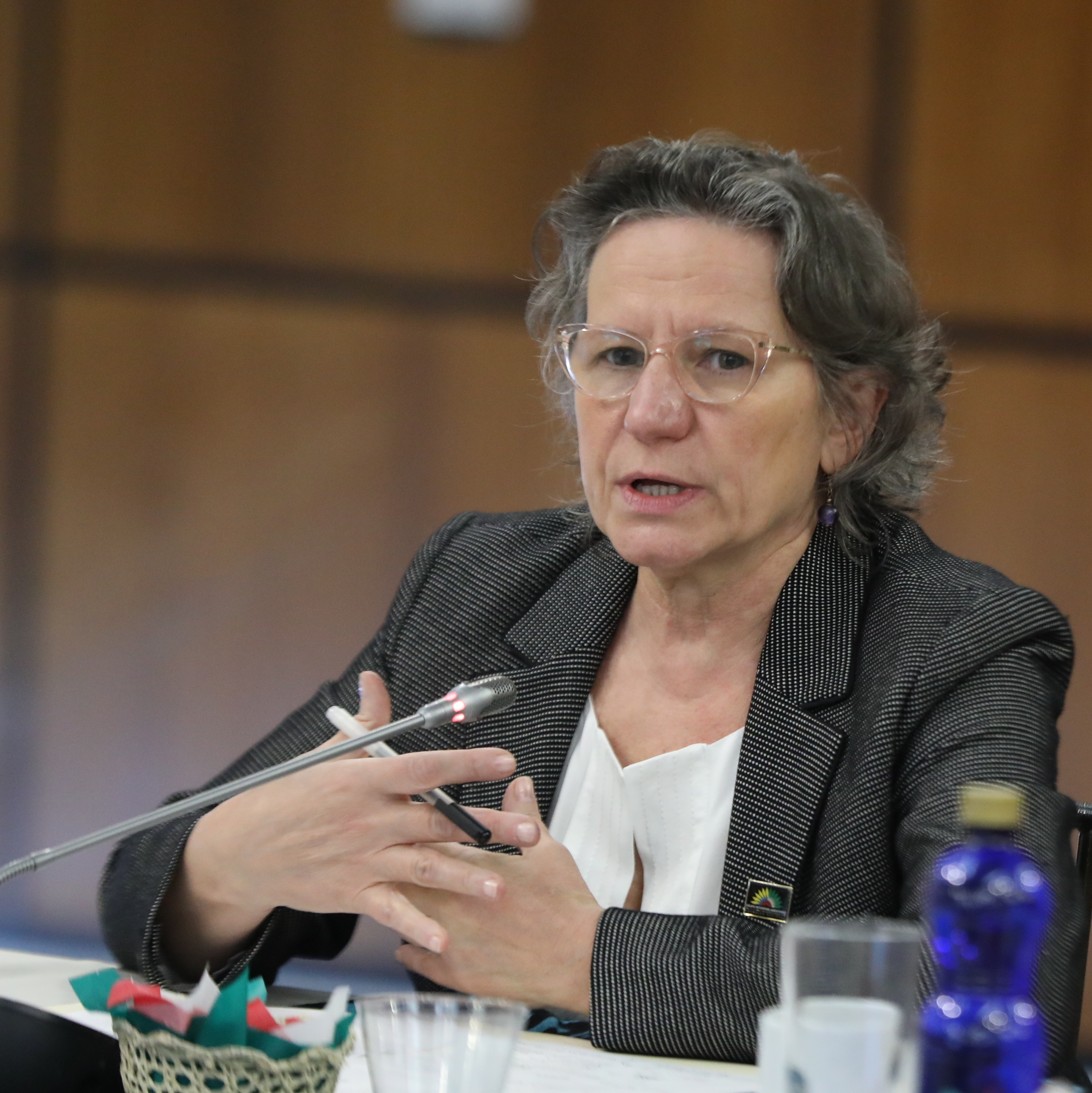
Caterina Bertolini, 2022

Caterina Bertolini (born 1959) is an Italian diplomat. She is ambassador to Ecuador.

== Life ==
She graduated from University of Florence. She was attache to Colombia. She was Chief of Mission in El Salvador and Colombia. She was permanent representative to the European Union. She was Special Envoy to International Cooperation for the Caribbean.

In 2020, she celebrated Festa della Repubblica. She facilitated agro-industrial co-operation.
