= List of ambassadors to Slovakia =

This is a list of ambassadors to Slovakia. Note that some ambassadors are responsible for more than one country while others are directly accredited to Bratislava.

== Current ambassadors to Slovakia ==
Sending country	Presentation of credentials	Location of resident embassy	Ambassador	Embassy Website
Azerbaijan	24 January 2024	Bratislava Slovakia	Vusal Hajimakhmud Abdullayev	
Afghanistan	Vacant	Prague, Czech Republic	Vacant	
Albania	19 December 2023	Bratislava, Slovakia	Arten Hanku	
Algeria	25 November 2023	Vienna, Austria	Larbi Latroch	
Andorra	8 February 2020	Vienna, Austria	Jaume Serra Serra	
Angola	12 February 2024	Vienna, Austria	Isabel de Jesus da Costa Godinho	
Argentina	14 January 2025	Vienna, Austria	Gustavo Rodolfo Zlauvinen	
Armenia	25 October 2024	Vienna, Austria	Andranik Hovhannisyan	
Australia	22 May 2023	Vienna, Austria	Ian Biggs (Ambassador agréé)	
Austria	10 October 2023	Bratislava, Slovakia	Johannes Wimmer	
Azerbaijan	26 January 2024	Bratislava, Slovakia	Vusal Abdullayev	
The Bahamas				
Bangladesh	25 February 2025	Vienna, Austria	Toufique Hasan	
Belarus	29 January 2025	Bratislava, Slovakia	Andrei Dapkiunas	
Belgium	24 October 2022	Vienna, Austria	Caroline Vermeulen	
Benin	18 October 2024	Berlin, Germany	Corinne Brunet	
Bolivia		Vienna, Austria	Maria Jolanta Materna Gorna (Chargé d'Affaires a.i.)	
Bosnia and Herzegovina	4 July 2023	Prague, Czech Republic	Siniša Bencun	
Botswana		London, UK		
Brazil	18 October 2023	Bratislava, Slovakia	Gabriel Boff Moreira	
Bulgaria	27 April 2021	Bratislava, Slovakia	Vassil Petkov	
Burkina Faso	1 October 2021	Vienna, Austria	Maimounata Ouattara	
Burundi	14 February 2024	Berlin, Germany	Annonciata Sendazirasa	
Cambodia	23 October 2023	Berlin, Germany	Thyia Chheang	
Cameroon	2 November 2020	Berlin, Germany	Victor Ndocki	
Canada	19 September 2024	Vienna, Austria	Karen Elizabeth Mollica	
Cape Verde		Vienna, Austria	Hércules do Nascimento Cruz (Chargé d'Affaires a.i.)	
Chile	21 May 2024	Bratislava, Slovakia	Alex Wetzig	
China	27 September 2023	Bratislava, Slovakia	Cai Ge	
Colombia	1 August 2023	Vienna, Austria	Laura Gabriela Gil Savastano	
Congo		Berlin, Germany	Jacques Yvon Ndolou	
Costa Rica	18 December 2024	Vienna, Austria	Olga Marta Sauma Uribe	
Croatia	March 2018	Bratislava, Slovakia	Aleksandar Heina	
Cuba		Bratislava, Slovakia	Rafael Pino Bécquer	
Cyprus	15 August 2023	Bratislava, Slovakia	Michael Karagiorgis	
Democratic Republic of Congo		Prague, Czech Republic	Romain Mukengela Kalanda (Chargé d'Affaires a.i.)	
Czech Republic	26 January 2023	Bratislava, Slovakia	Rudolf Jindrák	
Denmark	1 September 2022	Vienna, Austria	Christian Grønbech-Jensen	
Ecuador	19 November 2021	Vienna, Austria	Mireya del Carmen Muñoz Mera	
Egypt	17 October 2025	Bratislava, Slovakia	Walid Mohamed Ismail	
El Salvador	2022	Vienna, Austria	Julia Emma Villatoro Tario	
Estonia	23 November 2022	Vienna, Austria	Merle Pajula	
Ethiopia	23 November 2024	Berlin, Germany	Eskindir Yirga Asfaw	
Finland	1 July 2022	Prague, Czech Republic	Pasi Olavi Tuominen	
France	23 October 2024	Bratislava, Slovakia	Nicolas Suran	
Gambia	23 July 2024	Brussels, Belgium	Pa Musa Jobarteh	
Georgia	24 July 2025	Bratislava, Slovakia	Konstantine Kvachakidze	
Germany	1 July 2024	Bratislava, Slovakia	Thomas Kurz	
Ghana	1 June 2023	Prague, Czech Republic	Doris Adzo Denyo Brese	
Greece	14 December 2022	Bratislava, Slovakia	Athanasios Ioannou	
Guatemala	6 November 2024	Vienna, Austria	Jose Alberto Briz Gutierrez	
Guinea		Berlin, Germany	Aliou Barry	
Holy See	2 July 2022	Bratislava, Slovakia	Nicola Girasoli	
Hungary		Bratislava, Slovakia	Csaba Balogh	
Iceland	29 August 2023	Vienna, Austria	Helga Hauksdóttir	
India	16 August 2023	Bratislava, Slovakia	Apoorva Srivastava	
Indonesia	19 January 2022	Bratislava, Slovakia	R. Pribadi Sutiono	
Iran	29 January 2025	Vienna, Austria	Asadollah Esragh Jahromi	
Iraq	29 September 2020	Bratislava, Slovakia	Baker Fattah Hussen Hussen	
Ireland	9 September 2021	Bratislava, Slovakia	Dermot McGauran	
Israel	19 January 2022	Bratislava, Slovakia	Eitan Levon	
Italy	18 November 2024	Bratislava, Slovakia	Gianclemente De Felice	
Jamaica		Berlin, Germany	Deniese Ava-Lou Sealey (chargé d´affaires)	
Japan	20 November 2023	Bratislava, Slovakia	Yasuhiro Kawakami	
Jordan		Vienna, Austria	Rana Abida (chargé d´affaires)	
Kazakhstan	7 June 2022	Bratislava, Slovakia	Tolezhan Barlybayev	
Kenya		Vienna, Austria	Harriet Mururi Nduma (Chargé d'Affaires a.i.)	
Kuwait		Bratislava, Slovakia	Saud A. Kh. Almekhled (Chargé d'Affaires a.i.)	
Kyrgyzstan	15 April 2024	Vienna, Austria	Tolendy Makeyev	
Laos	15 March 2023	Vienna, Austria	Khonepheng Thammavong	
Latvia	7 December 2021	Vienna, Austria	Guna Japina	
Lebanon	13 February 2019	Vienna, Austria	Ibrahim Assaf	
Lesotho		Rome, Italy	Malikopo Patricia Rakootje (First Secretary)	
Libya	24 January 2024	Bratislava, Slovakia	Khalid S. M. Shaban	
Lithuania	19 January 2023	Vienna, Austria	Lina Rukštelienė	
Luxembourg	19 January 2023	Vienna, Austria	Jean Graff	
Madagascar		Moscow, Russia	Hantavololona Ramahazosoa (Chargé d'Affaires a.i.)	
Malawi	29 January 2025	Berlin, Germany	Joseph John Mpinganjira	
Malaysia	7 December 2021	Vienna, Austria	Ikram Bin Mohd Ibrahim	
Mali	11 April 2022	Rome, Italy	Aly Coulibaly	
Malta	13 July 2022	Vienna, Austria	Simon Cachia	
Mauritania	18 April 2024	Berlin, Germany	Boubacar Kane	
Mauritius	5 December 2007	Berlin, Germany	Marie Ghiselaine Henrison	
Mexico	4 March 2025	Vienna, Austria	José Antonio Zabalgoitia Trejo	
Moldova	4 March 2025	Vienna, Austria	Victoria Roșa	
Mongolia	11 April 2022	Prague, Czech Republic	Damdin Gansukh	
Montenegro	24 November 2025	Vienna, Austria	Stanica Anđić	
Morocco	29 September 2020	Vienna, Austria	Azzeddine Farhane	
Namibia	15 April 2024	Vienna, Austria	Vasco Mushe Samupofu	
Nepal		Vienna, Austria	Sagar Prasad Phuyal (Chargé d'Affaires a.i.)	
Netherlands	4 March 2025	Bratislava, Slovakia	Jules Gerzon	
New Zealand	4 March 2025	Vienna, Austria	Andrew Rive Williams	
Nicaragua	18 April 2024	Madrid, Spain	Maurizio Carlo Alberto Gelli	
Niger	Vacant	Berlin, Germany	Vacant	
Nigeria		Vienna, Austria	Dogondaji Haliru Bello (Chargé d'Affaires a.i.)	
North Korea	2 December 2020	Prague, Czech Republic	Won Chol Ju	
North Macedonia	22 November 2022	Vienna, Austria	Evgenija Ilieva	
Norway	15 April 2024	Vienna, Austria	Susan Eckey	
Oman	2 December 2020	Vienna, Austria	Yousuf Ahmed Hamed Al Jabri	
Pakistan	4 March 2025	Vienna, Austria	Mohammad Kamran Akhtar Malik	
Palestine	15 August 2023	Bratislava, Slovakia	Safa A.M. Khaldi	
Panama		Vienna, Austria	Natanael Pineda Rodríguez (Chargé d'Affaires a.i.)	
Paraguay	7 July 2021	Vienna, Austria	Juan Francisco Facetti Fernandez	
Peru		Vienna, Austria	Claudia Elizabeth Guevara De La Jara (Chargé d'Affaires a.i.)	
Philippines	25 October 2023	Vienna, Austria	Evangelina Lourdes A. Bernas	
Poland		Bratislava, Slovakia	Piotr SAmerek (Chargé d'Affaires a.i.)	
Portugal	20 November 2023	Bratislava, Slovakia	Maria João Falcão Poppe Lopes Cardoso	
Qatar	12 February 2024	Vienna, Austria	Jassim Yaaqob Y.A. Al-Hamadi	
Romania	24 June 2021	Bratislava, Slovakia	Călin Fabian	
Russia	2 December 2025	Bratislava, Slovakia	Sergey Andreyev	
Rwanda	21 May 2019	Berlin, Germany	Igor Cesar	
San Marino	23 July 2024	Vienna, Austria	Elena Molaroni	
Saudi Arabia	12 February 2024	Vienna, Austria	Abdullah bin Khaled Tawlah	
Senegal	Vacant	Warsaw, Poland	Vacant	
Serbia	27 March 2024	Bratislava, Slovakia	Aleksandar Nakić	
Seychelles	Vacant	Paris, France	Vacant	
Sierra Leone		Moscow, Russia	John Bobor Laggah (Counselor)	
Singapore	18 September 2014	Singapore, Singapore	Chay Wai Chuen	
Slovenia	5 November 2024	Bratislava, Slovakia	Stanislav Raščan	
Somalia		Moscow, Russia	Mohamed Mahmoud Handule (Ambassador Designate)	
South Africa	7 July 2021	Vienna, Austria	Rapulane Sydney Molekane	
South Korea	29 March 2022	Bratislava, Slovakia	Byeongdo Lee	
Sovereign Military Order of Malta	6 September 2016	Bratislava, Slovakia	Alfred Prinz von Schӧnburg-Hartenstein	
Spain	9 September 2021	Bratislava, Slovakia	Lorea Arribalzaga Ceballos	
Sri Lanka		Vienna, Austria	Mahesh Gunawardana (Chargé d'Affaires a.i.)	
Sudan	15 April 2024	Vienna, Austria	Magdi Ahmed Mofadal ELnour	
Swaziland	Vacant	Brussels, Belgium	vacant	
Sweden	7 December 2021	Vienna, Austria	Annika Markovic	
Switzerland	27 September 2022	Bratislava, Slovakia	Peter Nelson	
Syria		Vienna, Austria	Hasan Khaddour (Chargé d'Affaires a.i.)	
Tajikistan	13 February 2019	Vienna, Austria	Idibek Kalandar	
Tanzania		Berlin, Germany	Hassan Iddi Mwamweta	
Thailand		Vienna, Austria	Cheevindh Nathalang (Chargé d'Affaires a.i.)	
Tunisia	11 April 2022	Budapest, Hungary	Abdelkarim Hermi	
Turkey	15 April 2024	Bratislava, Slovakia	Erkan Özoral	
Turkmenistan	4 July 2023	Vienna, Austria	Hemra AMannazarov	
Ukraine	14 February 2023	Bratislava, Slovakia	Myroslav Myronovyč Kastran	
United Arab Emirates	15 March 2023	Vienna, Austria	Hamad Ali Mohammed Subaih Al Kaabi	
United Kingdom	3 September 2020	Bratislava, Slovakia	Nigel Marcus Baker	
United States	28 September 2022	Bratislava, Slovakia	Gautam A. Rana	
Uruguay		Vienna, Austria	Maria Elizabeth Bogosián Álvarez (Chargé d'Affaires a.i.)	
Uzbekistan	4 March 2025	Vienna, Austria	Bakhtiyor Ibragimov	
Venezuela		Vienna, Austria	Dulfa Dalila Hernández Medina (Chargé d'Affaires a.i.)	
Vietnam	28 January 2025	Bratislava, Slovakia	Giang Truong Pham	
Yemen	18 June 2018	Vienna, Austria	Haytham Abdulmomen Hassan Shoja´Aadin	
Zambia		Berlin, Germany	Brig. Gen. Sylvester Himwiinga (Military Attaché)	
Zimbabwe		Geneva, Switzerland	Taonga Mushayavanhu (Ambassador Designate)	

== See also ==
- Foreign relations of Slovakia
- List of diplomatic missions of Slovakia
- List of diplomatic missions in Slovakia
