= Patrizia Falcinelli =

Italian diplomat

Patrizia Falcinelli (born January 28, 1965, in Palermo), since June 2020, has been the Italian Ambassador to Greece. She replaced Efisio Luigi Marras at the end of his term.

Falcinelli earned a degree from the School of Political Science at the University of Perugia. She graduated in 1989 as an international relations major and entered the diplomatic corps in 1992.
