= Serra Kaleli =

Turkish diplomat

Turkey Ambassador to Slovenia
- In office 1 August 2012 – 16 November 2016
- President: Abdullah Gül; Recep Tayyip Erdoğan
- Preceded by: Derya Kanbay
- Succeeded by: Esen Altuğ

Personal details
- Spouse: Bahadır Kaleli
- Children: 1
- Profession: Diplomat

Serra Kaleli is a Turkish diplomat and ambassador of Turkey.

Kaleli was vice consul in West Berlin, Germany from 1987 to 1990. Her next post was Second Secretary at the diplomatic mission in Islamabad, Pakistan for two years until 1992. She worked as First Secretary in Kyiv, Ukraine between 1992 and 1994. After two years of service back in the Ministry, she was assigned in 1996 to Washington D.C., United States serving four years as counselor. Before she was appointed as a counselor to London, United Kingdom in 2005, Kaleli worked in the Ministry for another five years. Her husband, diplomat Bahadır Kaleli, and their one-and-a-half-year-old daughter accompanied her to London. After returning home in 2009, she worked for three years in the Ministry.

Kaleli was appointed Ambassador of Turkey to Slovenia taking office on 1 August 2012. She served in Ljubljana until 16 November 2016.

From September 2017 to December 2022, she was a deputy member of the Supervisory Board in the Ministry.
