= Rossella Franchini Sherifis =

Italian diplomat

Rossella Franchini Sherifis (Ancona, 19 April 1953) is an Italian diplomat, Ambassador to the Grand-Duchy of Luxembourg (2016-2020) and to the Republic of Slovenia (2011-2016).

She graduated cum laude in Political Science at the University of Florence, Italy (1976), and earned a Master's Degree in International Public Policy at S.A.I.S., Johns Hopkins University, Washington D.C. (1993)

A career diplomat since 1978, before achieving Ambassadorial rank she was posted at the Consulate General in New York, at the Embassies in Belgrade and Athens, at the Permanent Representation of Italy to the European Union in Brussels.

In Rome, she served at the Prime Minister's Office as thematic Coordinator of the 2001 Italian Presidency of the G7/G8 and as Director of International Relations and European Affairs for Tourism.

== Decorations ==
Grand-Officer, Order of Merit of the Italian Republic (2011)

Commander, Order of the Phoenix of the Hellenic Republic (2004)

Commander, Order of the Oak Crown of Luxembourg (2020)

== See also ==
- Ministry of Foreign Affairs (Italy)
- Foreign relations of Italy
