= Sergio Fenoaltea =

Italian ambassador (1908–1995)

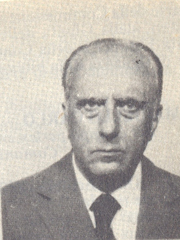
- Fenoaltea in 1976.

Italian Ambassador to Canada
- In office 1955–1958

Italian Ambassador to Belgium
- In office 1958–1961

Italian Ambassador to the United States
- In office 1961–1967

Personal details
- Born: 9 June 1908 (age 118) Marino, Lazio, Italy
- Died: 13 April 1995 (age 31)

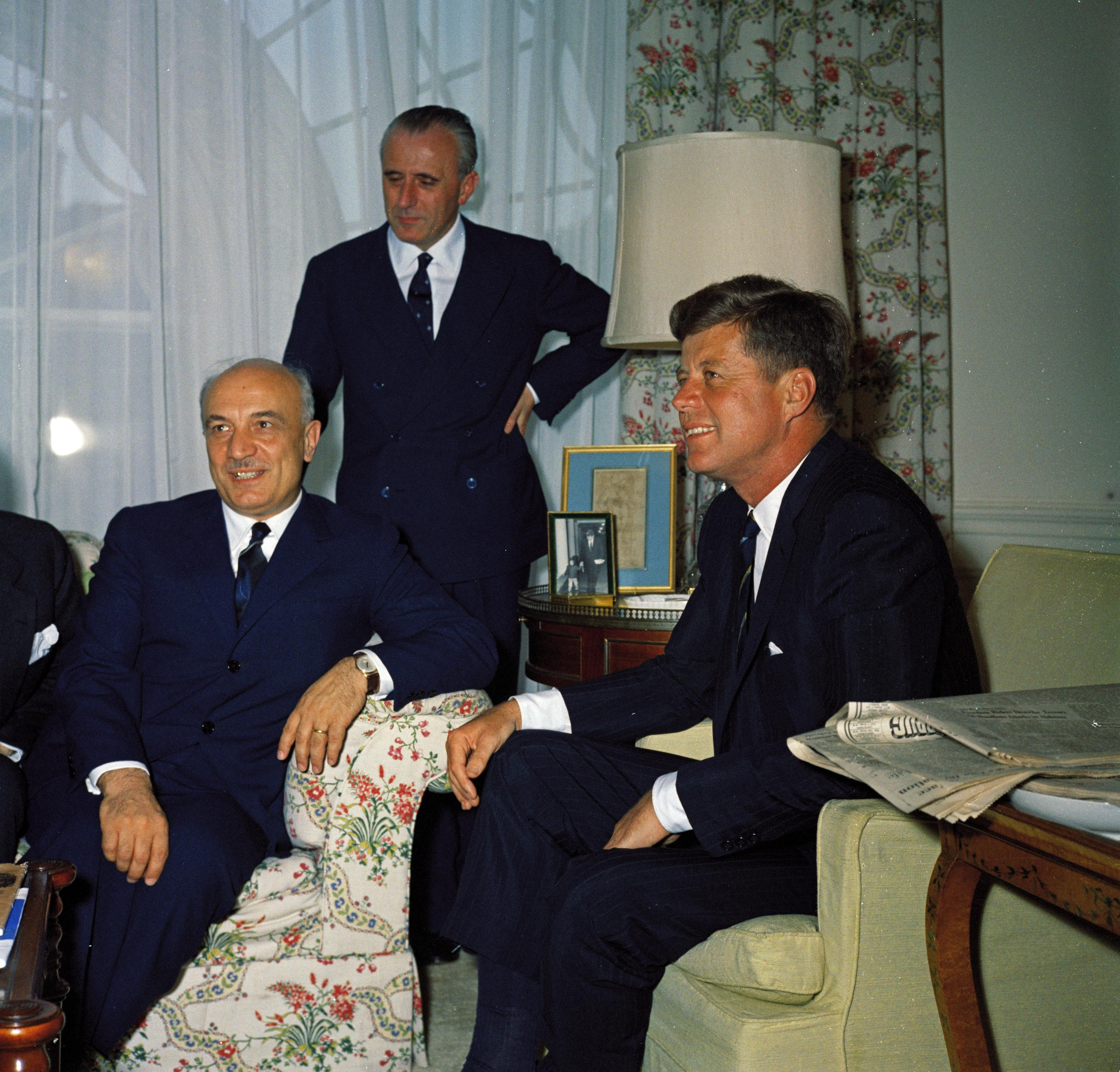
Fenoaltea with Prime Minister Amintore Fanfani and U.S. President John F. Kennedy in the West Sitting Hall, White House, 1961.

Sergio Fenoaltea (June 9, 1908 - April 13, 1995) was an Italian diplomat. Born in Marino, Lazio near Rome, he was jailed under Mussolini and later joined the National Liberation Committee. He was the Italian ambassador to Canada from 1955 to 1958, to Belgium from 1958 to 1961, and to the United States from 1961 to 1967. His son, Stefano Fenoaltea, became an economic historian.

== Biography ==
He was originally from Marino, Lazio, in the province of Rome. An anti-fascist, after July 25, 1943, he represented the Action Party on the National Liberation Committee alongside Ugo La Malfa.

He served as undersecretary to the Prime Minister (on an interim basis) in the second Bonomi government (June 18, 1944 – December 10, 1944) alongside Christian Democrat Giuseppe Spataro.

After World War II, he served as ambassador to China from 1946 to 1949, with the aim of restoring normal relations with Chiang Kai-shek’s Nationalist government and replacing Francesco Maria Taliani de Marchio as acting head of mission, at the request of Alcide De Gasperi.

He continued his diplomatic career as ambassador to Canada from 1955 to 1958, to Belgium from 1958 to 1961, and to the List of ambassadors of Italy to the United States, where he presented his credentials to John F. Kennedy in 1961; in 1967, he resigned due to a disagreement with then-Foreign Minister Amintore Fanfani.

In the 1976 general election, he ran for the Senate of the Republic (Italy) as a candidate for the Italian Democratic Socialist Party in the Tuscany district and was elected to the Senate.
