= Brunella Borzi Cornacchia =

Italian diplomat

Personal details
- Occupation: Diplomat

Brunella Borzi Cornacchia (born 1947) was an Italian diplomat who served as ambassador to Slovakia. She was born in Rome.
