= Giorgio Starace =

Italian diplomat

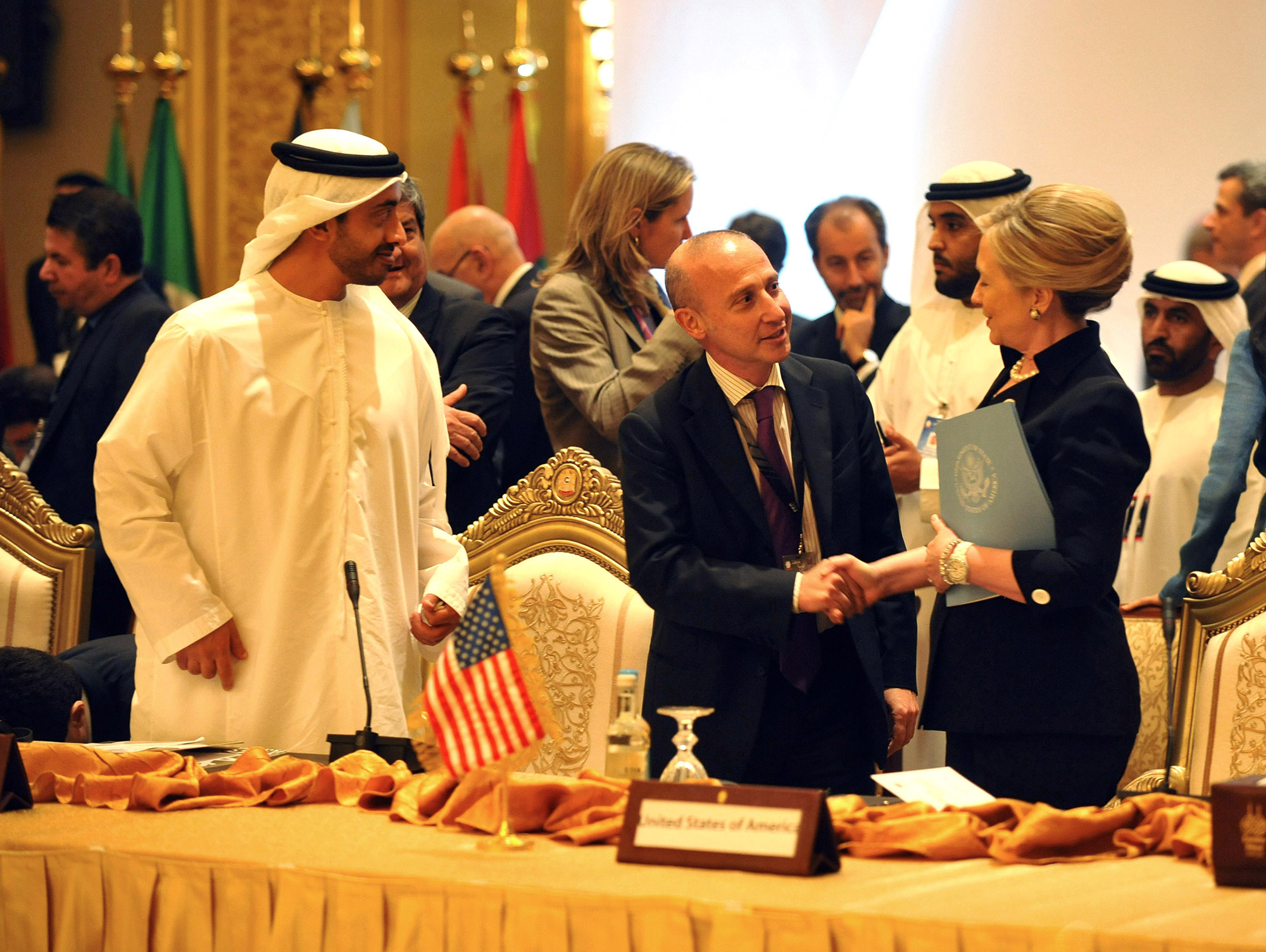
- Giorgio Starace with Hillary Clinton

Italy Ambassador to Russian Federation
- Incumbent
- Assumed office 2021
- Preceded by: Pasquale Terracciano

Italy Ambassador to Japan
- In office 11 May 2017 – 2021
- Preceded by: Domenico Giorgi
- Succeeded by: Gianluigi Benedetti

Italy Ambassador to the United Arab Emirates
- In office 30 September 2010 – 2014
- Preceded by: Paolo Dionisi
- Succeeded by: Liborio Stellino

Personal details
- Born: 23 February 1959 (age 67) Viterbo, Italy
- Profession: Diplomat

Giorgio Starace (born 23 February 1959 in Viterbo, Italy) is an Italian diplomat; he is the current ambassador to the Russian Federation. Earlier in his career, he was ambassador to Japan and to the United Arab Emirates.

== Life and diplomatic career ==
Having graduated with a degree in Political Economy at Bocconi University in 1982, Starace began his diplomatic career in 1985 in the Directorate General for Economic Affairs. Following his role as the chief of relations with the European Economic Community, in 1987 Starace became a member of the secretariat of the Directorate General. In 1988 he became the second secretary for trade in Guatemala where he was later appointed first secretary in 1990. In 1992 he was transferred to Beijing, China, as first secretary for politics, where he later was promoted to the role of delegation advisor (1995).

In 1995 Starace returned to Rome with a position in the Directorate General for Economic Affairs for the Italian Presidency of the Council of the European Union. In 1996 he was appointed advisor for International Affairs of the Ministry of Agriculture, Food and Forestry Policies, working for ministers Michele Pinto and, in following years, Paolo De Castro, Luca Zaia, and Giancarlo Galan. As a part of this role, he took part in the negotiations on agricultural policies for the EU program Agenda 2000.

In 1996 he was honoured with the title of Knight of the Order of Merit of the Italian Republic.

In 1999 he was transferred to New York City, as Chief Press Officer for the Permanent Mission of Italy to the UN and was later promoted to Embassy Counsellor and then to First Counsellor (2001). In 2002 he was transferred to New Delhi, India with the role of deputy ambassador.

In 2004 he was honoured with the title of Officer of the Order of Merit of the Italian Republic.

In 2006 he returned to Rome as a diplomatic advisor for the Minister Paolo De Castro at the Ministry of Agriculture, Food and Forestry Policies. In 2008 he was promoted Envoy Extraordinary and Minister Plenipotentiary.

In 2010 Starace was transferred to Abu Dhabi, in the United Arab Emirates, as an Ambassador.

In 2014 he was awarded the post of Permanent Representative at the International Renewable Energy Agency.

In 2017 he was nominated Ambassador Extraordinary and Plenipotentiary to Japan.

In October 2021 he was nominated Ambassador Extraordinary and Plenipotentiary to the Russian Federation.

== Publications ==
- Weber, Maria (1995). Rapporto Cina: il successo del socialismo di mercato e il futuro di Hong Kong [China Report: the Success of " Market Socialism " and the Future of Hong Kong] (in Italian). Torino: Fondazione Giovanni Agnelli. ISBN 9788878601130.
- Secchi, Carlo (1983). La rilocalizzazione produttiva italiana nei Paesi in via di sviluppo (in Italian). Milan: Giuffrè Editore.

== Honours ==
Commander of the Order of Merit of the Italian Republic – October 10, 2016

Officer of the Order of Merit of the Italian Republic – June 6, 1996

== See also ==
- Ministry of Foreign Affairs (Italy)
- Foreign relations of Italy

== Bibliography ==
- Zaghi, Andrea (1999). La banda dei quattro (in Italian). Donzelli Editore. ISBN 9788879895200. – as one of the key actors in the 1997 EU Agenda 2000 negotiations
- Semestre Europeo n. 2 – Anno 1, Dicembre 2010. Gangemi Editore. 2010. ISBN 9788849220780.
