= Giovanni Gallina (diplomat) =

Italian politician (1852–1936)

Italian Minister to China
- In office 19 December 1901 – 10 July 1904
- Preceded by: Giuseppe Salvago Raggi
- Succeeded by: Carlo Baroli

Italian Ambassador to Japan
- In office 1907–1908
- Preceded by: Giulio Cesare Vinci
- Succeeded by: Alessandro Guiccioli

Italian Ambassador to France
- In office 1908–1910
- Preceded by: Giuseppe Tornielli Brusati di Vergano
- Succeeded by: Antonino Paternò Castello

Senator of the Kingdom of Italy
- In office 16 October 1913 – 17 August 1936

Personal details
- Born: 30 June 1852 Turin, Kingdom of Sardinia
- Died: August 17, 1936 (aged 84) Turin, Italy

Count Giovanni Gallina (30 December 1852 – 17 August 1936) was an Italian diplomat and politician. He became a senator on 16 October 1913.

== Biography ==
Count Giuseppe Pietro Maria Giovanni Gallina was born on 30 December 1852 in Turin, Kingdom of Sardinia, to a father who was an Italian patriot from 1821.

He graduated in law in 1880. In the same year he started his diplomatic career and was sent first to the Italian legation in St Petersburg, then to the legation in Constantinople, where he remained for several years.

In 1892 he is transferred to Beijing and later was ambassador in Tokyo and Paris. Since 1913 he sat in the Italian senate. He was Italian Ambassador to China from 19 December 1901 until 10 July 1904 and Italian Ambassador to France.

== Honors ==
Grand Officer of Saints Maurice and Lazarus

Grand Officer of the Order of the Crown of Italy

== See also ==
- Ministry of Foreign Affairs (Italy)
- Foreign relations of Italy
