= Torquato Cardilli =

Italian diplomat

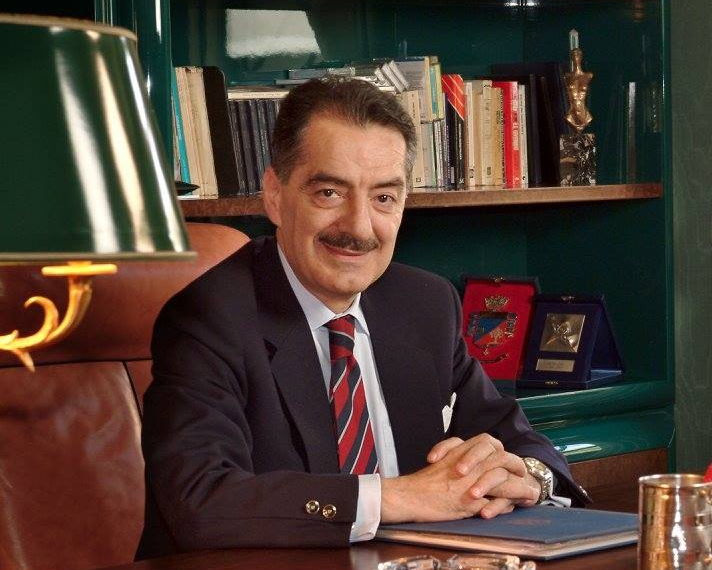

Torquato Cardilli (born November 24, 1942) is an Italian diplomat. He was born in L'Aquila, in the Abruzzo region of Italy. His father, Giuseppe Cardilli, was a renowned jeweller. Cardilli graduated with two degrees from the Istituto Universitario Orientale of Naples: first, in Oriental Culture and Languages, and then subsequently a second degree in political sciences. He was inspired to pursue a diplomatic career after a history professor gifted him the book "The Laughing Diplomat" by Daniele Varè . He joined the Italian Ministry of Foreign Affairs in 1967, at the age of 25. His first foreign posting was to Khartoum, Sudan, in 1969, where he was Second Secretary of the Italian Embassy. In 1972 he was appointed First Secretary to the Italian Embassy in Damascus, Syria where he was assigned to represent US interests after the rupture of diplomatic relations between the US and Syria. In October 1973, when the Yom Kippur War broke out, with Damascus under heavy bombardment from the Israeli Air Force, he escorted a convoy of Italian citizens safely across the border into Lebanon.

His subsequent postings were to Baghdad, Iraq in 1974; to Tripoli, Libya in 1979; to The Hague, the Netherlands in 1982. In 1990, at age 48, he was appointed Ambassador to Tirana, in Albania. His subsequent postings as Italian Ambassador were to Tanzania and Comoros in (1993–1997), the Kingdom of Saudi Arabia (2000–2003) and Angola and the Republic of Sao Tomé and Principe (2005–2009). He retired in 2009 after a career spanning 42 years, of which 31 were spent abroad. Ambassador Cardilli is a polyglot: in addition to Italian, he speaks and writes, Arabic, English, French and Spanish fluently.

While studying Arabic in Jerusalem in 1964, Torquato Cardilli privately converted to Islam. However, this only became public nearly four decades later, during his tenure as Ambassador to Saudi Arabia when Saudi media initially erroneously reported Cardilli had just converted in Saudi Arabia.

He is the father of Darianna Cardilli, a documentary filmmaker.
