= Alfredo Bastianelli =

Italian diplomat

Alfredo Bastianelli OMRI GCSG
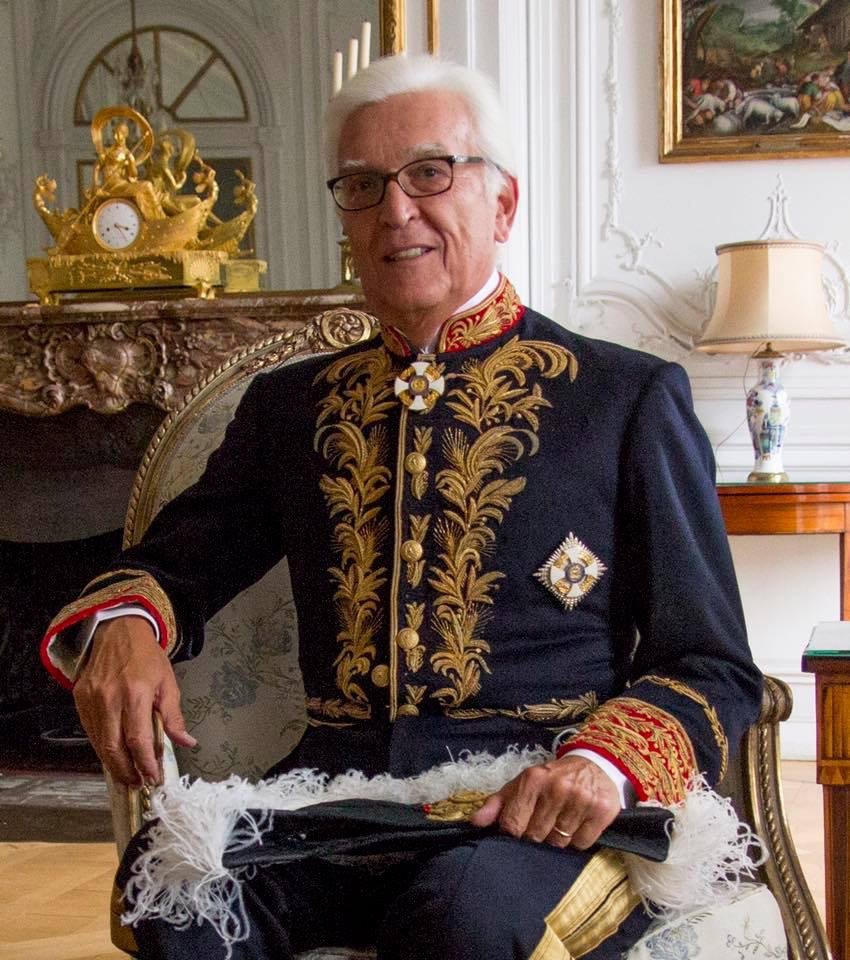
- Bastianelli in 2015

Ambassador of Italy in Angola
- In office January 22, 2001 – June 15, 2005
- Preceded by: Paolo Sannella
- Succeeded by: Torquato Cardelli

Ambassador of Italy in Cyprus
- In office December 1, 2009 – December 2012
- Preceded by: Luigi Napolitano
- Succeeded by: Guido Cerboni

Ambassador of Italy in Belgium
- In office 2013–2015
- Preceded by: Roberto Bettarini
- Succeeded by: Vincenzo Grassi

Chancellor of the Order of the Holy Sepulchre
- Incumbent
- Assumed office 2016
- Preceded by: Ivan Rebernik

Personal details
- Born: January 26, 1951 (age 75) Rome, Lazio, Italy
- Children: 3
- Education: Sapienza University of Rome

Alfredo Bastianelli OMRI GCSG (born 26 January 1951) is an Italian diplomat, Chancellor of the Order of the Holy Sepulchre, and Papal Gentleman. He is married and has three children.

== Education ==
Bastianelli holds a law degree from Sapienza University of Rome. Besides his native Italian, Bastianelli speaks English, French and Portuguese.

== Career ==
He held various posts in the Italian Ministry of Foreign Affairs and diplomatic missions of Italy in Brazil, Canada, Mozambique, Indonesia, European Union.

From 2001 to 2005 he served as an Ambassador to Angola. From 2009 to 2012 he was an ambassador to Cyprus.

From 2013 to 2015 he was an ambassador to Belgium. At the same time, in 2014, for a few months he was in charge of the Istituto Italiano di Cultura in Bruxelles, pending the appointment of a new director.

In 2016 he was appointed Chancellor of the Order of the Holy Sepulchre by Edwin Frederick Cardinal O'Brien, the Order's Grand Master.

== Honors ==
- Papal Gentleman, Holy See (since 2007)
- Knight Grand Cross of Equestrian Order of the Holy Sepulchre of Jerusalem, Holy See;
- Knight Grand Cross of the Order of St. Gregory the Great, Holy See;
- Knight Grand Cross of the Ordre de la Couronne, Kingdom of Belgium;
- Knight Grand Cross of the Order of Independence, Jordan;
- (Kingdom of the Two Sicilies) Knight Grand Cross of the Sacred Military Constantinian Order of Saint George;
- Knight Grand Cross of the Order pro merito melitensi, Sovereign Military Order of Malta.
- (Italy) Grand Officer of the Order of Merit of the Italian Republic.
- Chevalier d’Honneur of Confrérie de la Chaîne des Rôtisseurs.

== See also ==
- Ministry of Foreign Affairs (Italy)
- Foreign relations of Italy
