= Mysliveček =

Mysliveček (feminine Myslivečková), (diminutive form of "Myslivec") is a Czech surname:

- Jaroslav Mysliveček, Czech rower
- Josef Mysliveček (1737–1781), Czech composer

- 53159 Mysliveček

- Lucie Myslivečková, Czech-Slovak figure skater
- Zdeněk Mysliveček (1881–1974), Czech psychiatrist
- Martin Mysliveček (born 1950), Czech guitarist

== See also ==
- Myśliwiec (disambiguation)
