= Rebernik =

Rebernik is a surname. Notable people with the surname include:

- Ivan Rebernik (1939–2026), Slovenian diplomat and librarian
- Mihael Rebernik (born 1996), Croatian footballer
