= Ivan Rebernik =

Slovenian diplomat (1939–2026)

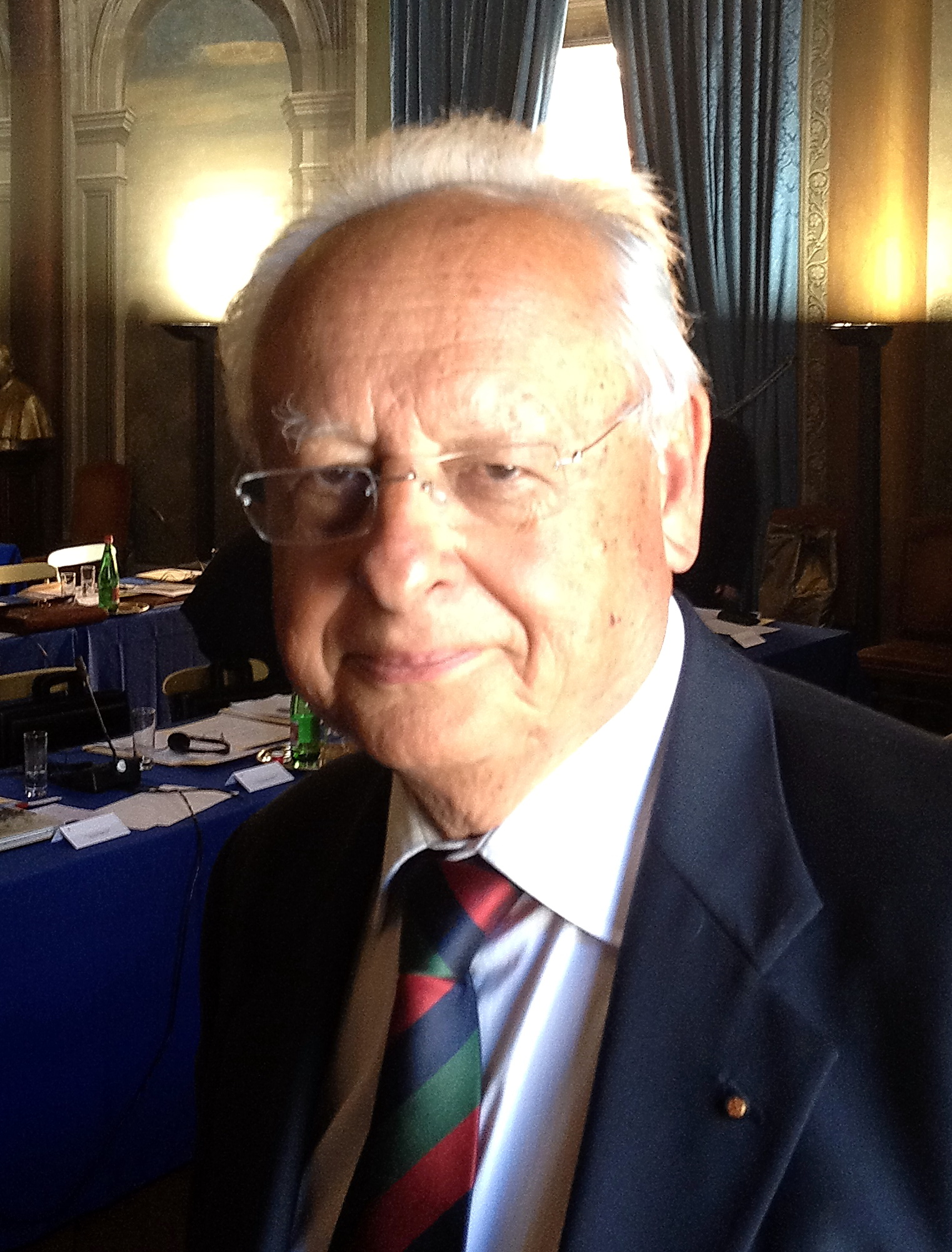
- Rebernik in 2012

Ambassador of Slovenia to the Holy See
- In office 2006–2010
- Preceded by: Ludvik Toplak
- Succeeded by: Maja Marija Lovrenčič Svetek

Chancellor of the Order of the Holy Sepulchre
- In office 2012–2016
- Preceded by: Mgr. Hans Brouwers
- Succeeded by: Alfredo Bastianelli

Personal details
- Born: 7 October 1939 Maribor, Yugoslavia
- Died: 15 April 2026 (aged 86) Rome, Italy
- Education: Pontifical Gregorian University

Ivan Rebernik (7 October 1939 – 15 April 2026) was a Slovenian diplomat and librarian who served as Slovenian ambassador to the Holy See and Chancellor of the Order of the Holy Sepulchre.

== Background ==
Rebernik received his bachelor's degree in theology and his doctorate in philosophy from the Pontifical Gregorian University. In 1984, Rebernik studied the administration of an automated library as a visiting expert at the Smithsonian Institution and at the Catholic University of America.

Besides his native Slovene, he spoke English, Italian, Serbo-Croatian, German, Russian, French and Spanish.

== Career ==
From 1964 to 1988, Rebernik worked at the library of Pontifical Gregorian University.

From 1972 to 1976, he also worked for RAI in Rome, where he was responsible for daily 20-minute radio broadcasts in Slovene.

From 1980 to 2004, he worked at the Vatican Library. For the first eight years, he was employed as a librarian and a teacher at the School of library and information science. Between 1988 and 2004, he was the director of the prints catalogue of the Vatican Library.

From 1994 to 2016, he also worked as an external advisor to the Embassy of Slovenia to the Holy See. In 2016, he was appointed Ambassador at the same embassy. He presented the letters of credence to Benedict XVI on 16 September 2016. His term ended in 2010 and he was succeeded by Maja Marija Lovrenčič Svetek.

== Personal life and death ==
Rebernik lived in Rome from 1960 until his death on 15 April 2026, at the age of 86. He was married with three children.

== Honours ==
In 1978, Rebernik became a Member of the Görres Society Historical Institutes.

In 2000, he was made a member of the Order of the Holy Sepulchre and a Knight of the Order of Malta.

In 2002, he was awarded the Order of St. Bridget of Sweden.

In 2009, he became a Knight Grand Cross of the Order of Pope Pius IX.

In 2011, he was awarded Order of Saints Cyril and Methodius.

In 2012, he was appointed Chancellor of the Order of the Holy Sepulchre by Grand Master Cardinal O'Brien. He chaired the work of the Commission on Appointments and Promotions, was in charge of the communications development including work on the Order's new website in five languages, and of the reorganization of the Grand Magisterium's archive. In 2016, his term has ended and Alfredo Bastianelli succeeded him. On 12 December 2016, Rebernik was appointed Chancellor of Honor.

In 2016, he received the Golden Palm of Jerusalem.

In 2017, he received the Silver Order of Merit of the Republic of Slovenia.
