= Myśliwiec =

Myśliwiec is a Polish-language occupational surname literally meaning "hunter". Notable people with the surname include:

- Andrzej Myśliwiec (born 1957), Polish field hockey player
- Karol Myśliwiec (born 1943), Polish egyptologist
- Piotr Myśliwiec (born 1952), Polish diplomat and chemist
