= Relics of Sainte-Chapelle =

Christian relics in Paris, France

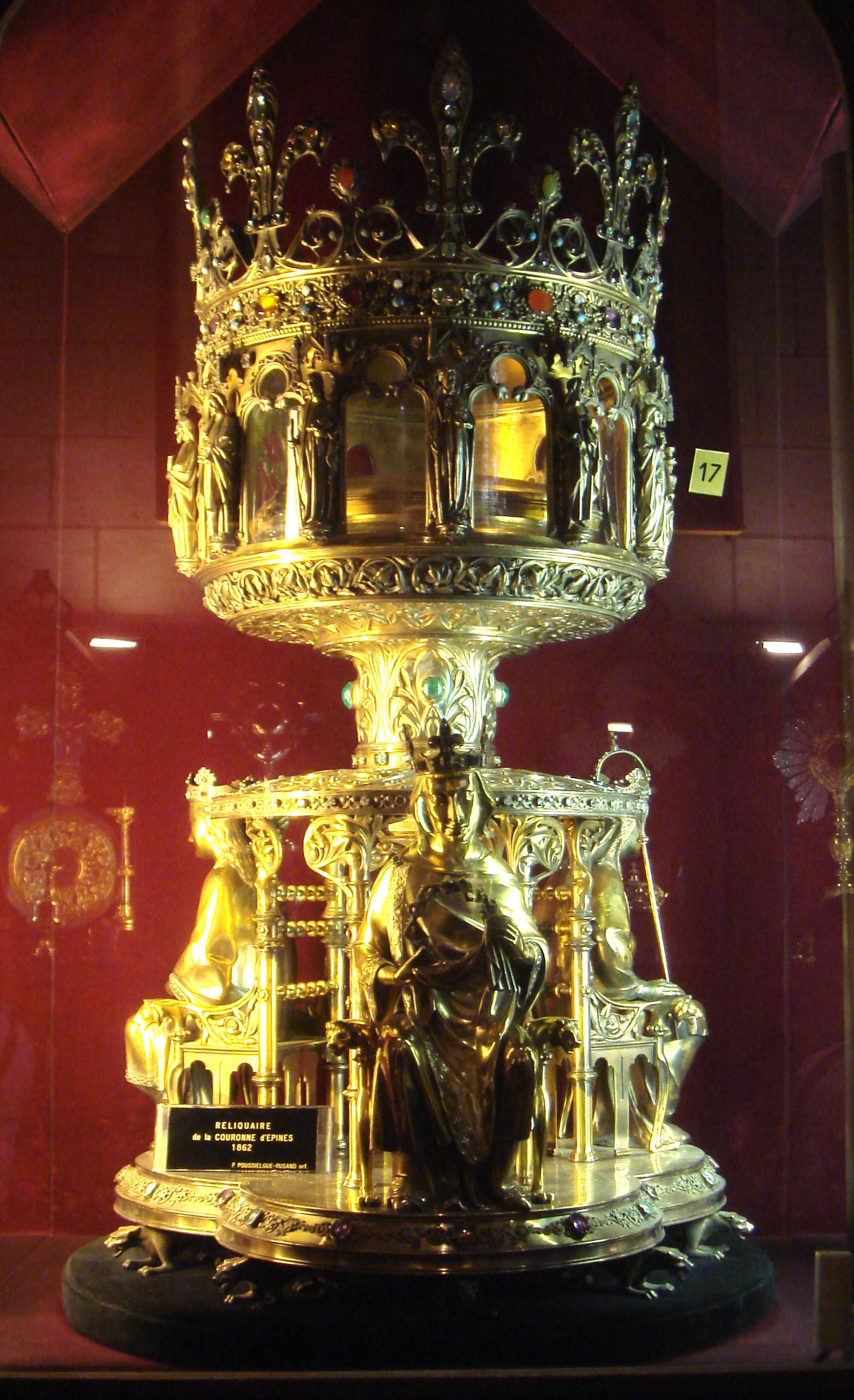
Reliquary of the Crown of Thorns

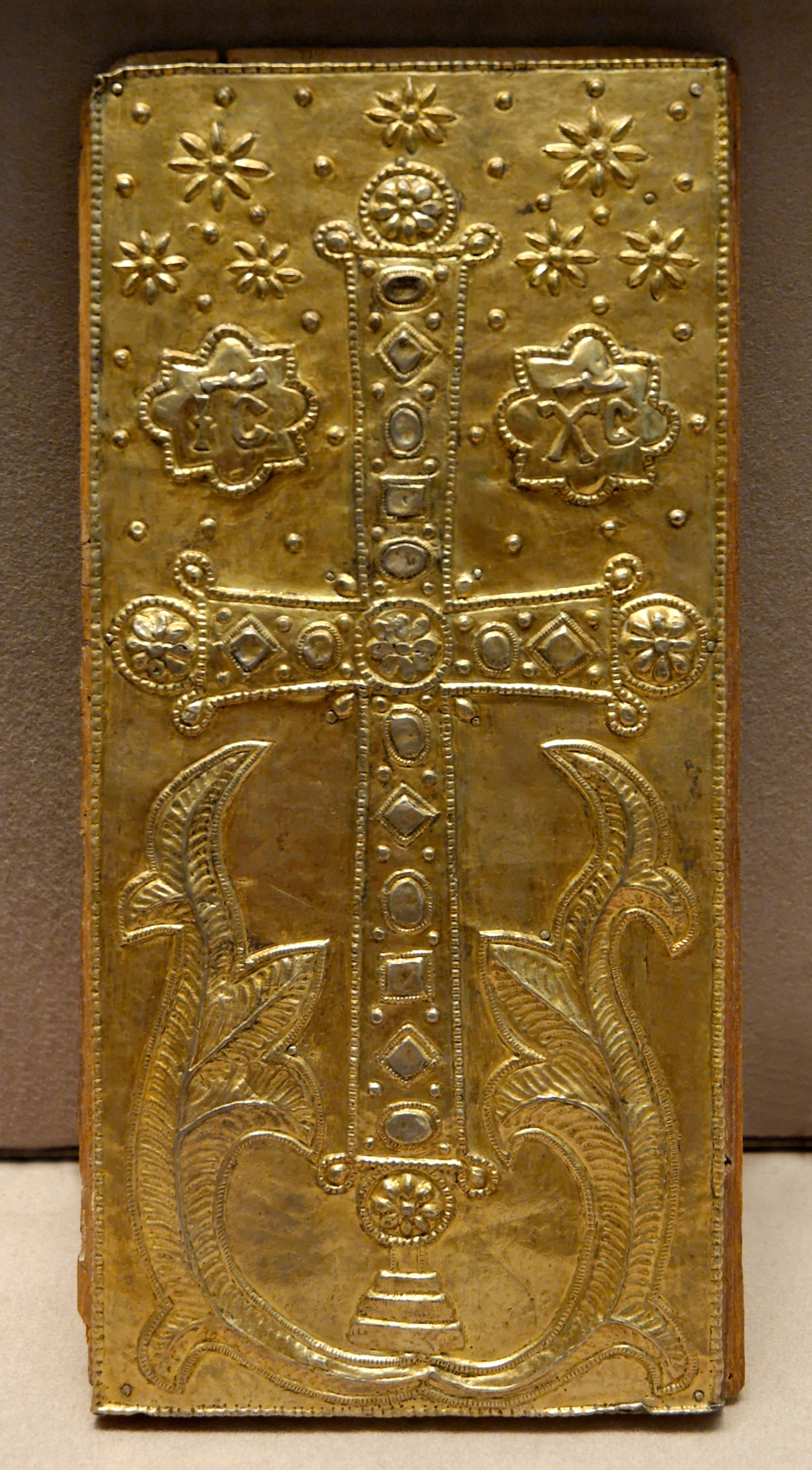
Sliding cover from a coffer that contained a "Sepulchre stone"

The Relics of Sainte-Chapelle are relics of Jesus Christ acquired by the French monarchy in the Middle Ages and now conserved by the Archdiocese of Paris. They were originally housed at Sainte-Chapelle in Paris, France and are now in the cathedral treasury of Notre-Dame de Paris.

== History ==
=== Medieval and early modern ===
Saint Louis (King Louis IX) built Sainte-Chapelle in the 13th century to house the Holy Crown, a fragment of the True Cross and other relics he had acquired from Baldwin II of Constantinople. This made the chapel itself an immense reliquary, housing the crown, the True Cross fragment, relics of the Virgin Mary (in particular her milk), the Holy Lance, the Holy Sponge and the Mandylion, a supposed image of Christ. The seventeen other relics purchased from Constantinople were the Blood of Christ, the nappies of the infant Jesus, a chain, a stone from the Holy Sepulchre, a cross, a purple mantle, a reed, part of his funeral shroud, the towel with which he dried the Apostles' feet, the rod of Moses, part of John the Baptist's head, and the heads of Saint Blas, Saint Clement, and Saint Simeon.

In the early modern era, the kings of France drained their treasury, sold rubies and melted down gold to supply their vast military spending needs, making all the chapel's ecclesiastical treasures into a monetary reserve that could be used if needed, as they had also been in the medieval era. This meant that under Henry IV of France (reigned 1589–1610) what was left of the treasure was reduced to the state it would retain until the French Revolution.

=== Revolution to present ===
The Revolution meant a ban on conserving relics and all other sacred symbols linked to the kings, though this allowed for pieces judged to be of high artistic quality to be saved. These relics were handed over to the archbishop of Paris in 1804 and are still held in the cathedral treasury of Notre Dame, cared for by the Knights of the Holy Sepulchre and the cathedral chapter. The first Friday of every month at 3 PM, guarded by the Knights, the Holy Relics are exposed for veneration by the faithful before the cathedral's high altar. Every Good Friday, this veneration lasts all day, punctuated by the liturgical offices. An exhibition entitled Le trésor de la Sainte-Chapelle was installed at the Louvre in 2001. After the April 2019 fire at Notre-Dame, the relics were moved for safekeeping first to the Paris city hall overnight, and then to the Louvre.

== Bibliography ==
- Durand, Jannic. Le trésor de la Sainte Chapelle. Exh. cat. Paris, 31 mai–27 août 2001. Réunion des musées nationaux, Paris, 2001.
- Hahn, Cynthia. The Reliquary Effect: Enshrining the Sacred Object. London: Reaktion Books, 2017: 122–130.
- Hahn, Cynthia. "The Sting of Death is the Thorn, But the Circle of the Crown is Victory Over Death: The Making of the Crown of Thorns." In Saints and Sacred Matter, edited by Cynthia Hahn and Holger Klein. Washington: Dumbarton Oaks, 2014: 107–109.
