= List of ambassadors to Angola =

Below is a list of the ambassadors to Angola,

- China: Zhang Beisan
- Cuba: Pedro Ross Leal
- Germany: Arne Freiherr von Kittlitz und Ottendorf
- India: Ajjampur Rangaiah Ghanashyam
- Israel: Avraham Benjamin
- Italy: Cardilli Torquato
- Japan:Ryōzō Myōi
- Philippines:Constancio R. Vingno, Jr.
- Poland: Piotr Myśliwiec
- Portugal: Francisco Ribeiro Teles
- Romania: Bogoroditza Alexandry
- United States of America: Dan Mozena
- Venezuela: Ruben Pacheco
