= Palm of Jerusalem =

- Palm of Jerusalem (of gold)
- Sponsored by: Order of the Holy Sepulchre
- Presented by: Cardinal Grand Master or Latin Patriarch of Jerusalem as Patriarch Grand Prior

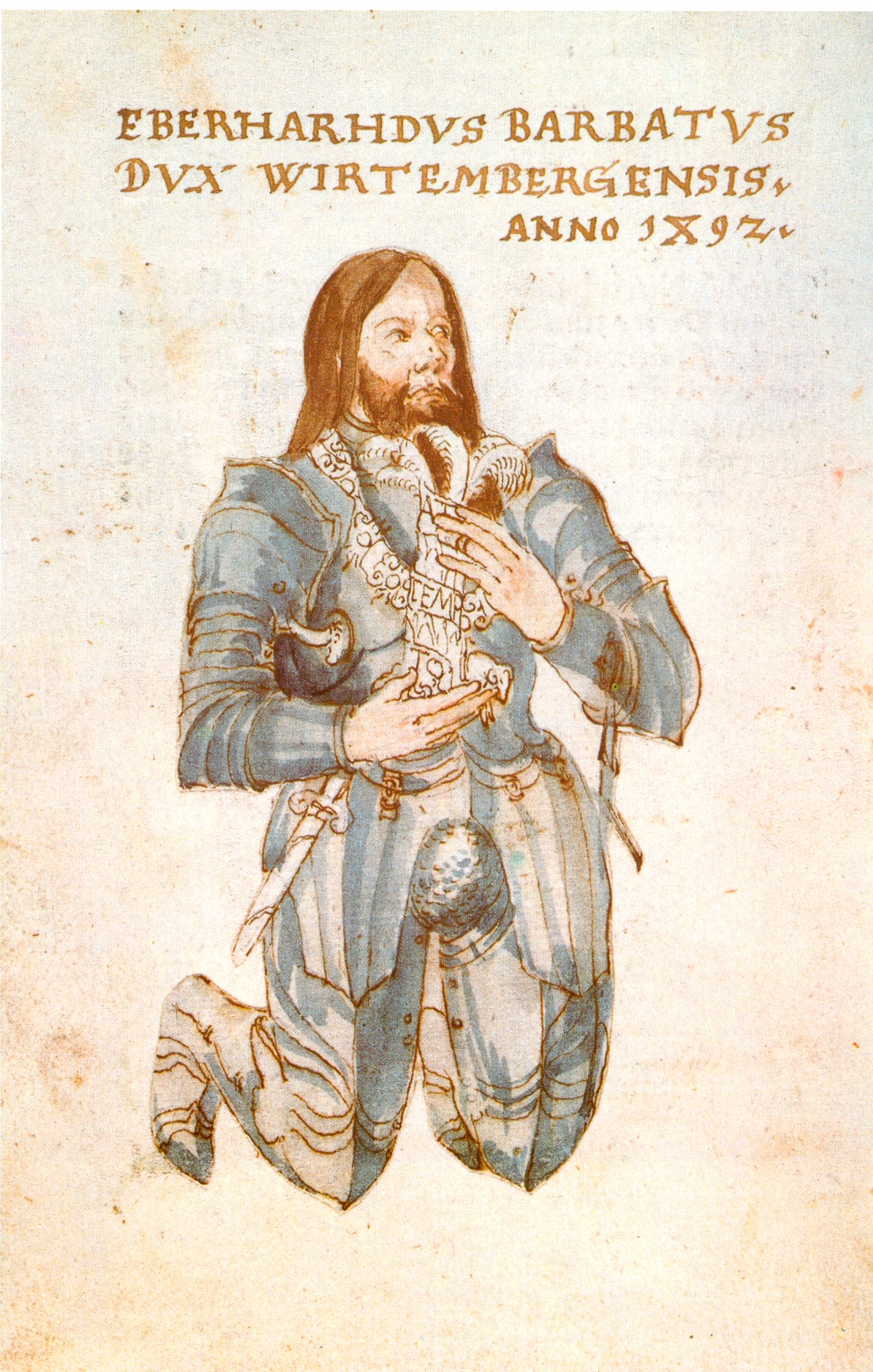
Eberhard I, Duke of Württemberg (1492). The Duke chose a palm as his personal symbol in commemoration of his pilgrimage to Jerusalem in 1468 when he became a Knight of the Holy Sepulchre.

The Palm of Jerusalem is an award of the Order of the Holy Sepulchre, a Roman Catholic Papal order of knighthood of the Holy See.

The Palm of Jerusalem, of gold, silver or bronze, may be conferred by the Cardinal Grand Master of the Order of the Holy Sepulchre to a person of flawless moral conduct, especially meritorious on behalf of the order or the Holy Land. In special cases, the order can be conferred by the Latin Patriarch of Jerusalem as Patriarch Grand Prior of the order, to a person with established residence in the Holy Land, and in exceptional cases, to persons in transit there.

The Palm of the order bears on its face the Jerusalem cross of Godfrey of Bouillon on a shield of gold, silver or bronze, surmounted by the motto "Deus lo vult". The entirety is surrounded by two palms in elliptic form, one with olive branches, the other with branches of laurel, enameled in green. On the side is engraved the inscription: "Palma Equestris Ordinis Sancti Sepulcri Hierosolymitani".

Those decorated with the Palm of the order wear the palm on their chest, hung on a band of watered black silk.
