= Piotr Myśliwiec =

Polish politician

Piotr Myśliwiec Ph.D.
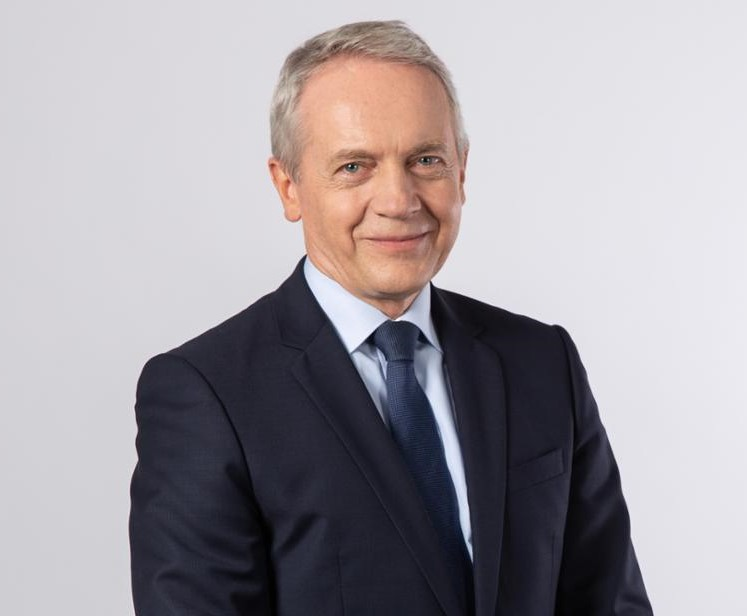

Poland Ambassador to Angola
- In office 2007 – 1 September 2010
- Preceded by: Eugeniusz Rzewuski
- Succeeded by: Marek Garztecki

Poland Ambassador to Angola
- In office July 2015 – 31 October 2023
- Preceded by: Marek Garztecki
- Succeeded by: Jan Pawelec

Personal details
- Born: 21 August 1952 (age 74) Proszowice, Poland
- Education: Tadeusz Kościuszko University of Technology
- Profession: Diplomat, chemist

Piotr Józef Myśliwiec (born 21 August 1952 in Proszowice) is a Polish diplomat and chemist, serving as a Poland ambassador to Angola (2007–2010, 2015–2023).

== Life ==
Piotr Myśliwiec was born on 21 August 1952 in Proszowice. He was educated at Tadeusz Kościuszko University of Technology, Faculty of Chemistry. In 1990, he defended his Ph.D. thesis on adsorption of water vapor at the Wrocław University of Science and Technology.

In the early 1990s, Myśliwiec joined the Polish diplomatic service. From 1993 to 2001, he held post of chargé d'Affaires a.i. at the Polish embassy in Abidjan, Ivory Coast. Later, he was in positions of Poland ambassador to Angola from 2007 to 1 September 2010. He returned on that post in July 2015. He was also accredited to the Democratic Republic of the Congo, the Republic of the Congo, Gabon, Central African Republic and São Tomé and Príncipe. He ended his term on 31 October 2023.

Apart from his native Polish, he speaks Portuguese, French and English. He has also basic knowledge of swahili and lingala languages.
