= Alba de Céspedes =

Cuban-Italian writer (1911–1997)

- Born: Alba de Céspedes y Bertini; 11 March 1911; Rome, Italy
- Died: 14 November 1997 (aged 86); Paris, France
- Spouses: Count Giuseppe Antamoro (m. 1926; div. 1931) Franco Bounous (m. 1945; died 1987)

Alba de Céspedes y Bertini (11 March 1911 – 14 November 1997) was a Cuban-Italian writer.

== Family ==
De Céspedes was the daughter of Carlos Manuel de Céspedes y Quesada (a Cuban ambassador to Italy) and his Italian wife, Laura Bertini y Alessandri. Her grandmother was Ana de Quesada y Loynaz and her grandfather was Carlos Manuel de Céspedes, who is the father of the nation of Cuba, and a distant cousin was Perucho Figueredo. She was married to Franco Bounous of the Italian foreign service, later ambassador to Cyprus and Pakistan. From a 1958 letter by De Céspedes, it can be evinced that the two had taken the decision to split, a request made by Bounous, due to her inability to follow him due to her professional career. Eventually, however, the couple would stay together until Bounous's death in 1987.

== Work ==
De Céspedes worked as a journalist in the 1930s for Piccolo, Epoca, and La Stampa. In 1935, she wrote her first novel, L’Anima Degli Altri. Her fiction writing was greatly influenced by the cultural developments that led to and resulted from World War II. In her writing, she instills her female characters with subjectivity. In her work, there is a recurring motif of women judging the rightness or wrongness of their actions. In 1935, she was jailed for her anti-fascist activities in Italy. Two of her novels were also banned (Nessuno Torna Indietro (1938) and La Fuga (1940)). In 1943, she was again imprisoned for her assistance with Radio Partigiana in Bari where she was a Resistance radio personality known as Clorinda. From June 1952 to the late 1958 she wrote an advice column, called Dalla parte di lei, in the magazine Epoca. She wrote the screenplay for the Michelangelo Antonioni 1955 film Le Amiche. Her work was also part of the literature event in the art competition at the 1936 Summer Olympics.

After the war she went to live in Paris. Although her books were bestsellers, De Céspedes has been overlooked in recent studies of Italian women writers.

== Select bibliography ==
- L’Anima Degli Altri (1935)
- Prigionie (1936)
- Io, Suo Padre (1936)
- Concerto (1937)
- Nessuno Torna Indietro [There's No Turning Back] (1938)
  - There's No Turning Back: A Novel. Translated by Goldstein, Ann. New York: Washington Square Press. 2025. ISBN 978-1-6680-8363-5.
- La Fuga (1940)
- Il Libro del Forestiero (1946)
- Dalla Parte Di Lei [The Best of Husbands] (1949)
  - Her Side of the Story. Translated by Foulston, Jill. New York: Astra House. 2023. ISBN 9781662601439. LCCN 2023014074.
- Quaderno proibito. Milan: Mondadori. 1952. LCCN 53019406. OCLC 1471604.
  - The Secret. Translated by Quigly, Isabel. London: Harvill Press. 1957. LCCN 59018254. OCLC 9355703.
  - Forbidden Notebook. Translated by Goldstein, Ann. New York: Astra House. 2023. LCCN 2022040939.
- Gli Affetti Di Famiglia (1952)
- Tra Donne De Sole (1955)
- Invito A Pranzo (1955)
- Prima E Dopo [Between Then and Now] (1956)
- Il Rimorso (1967)
- La Bambalona (1967)
- Chansons des filles de mai (1968)
- Sans Autre Lieu Que La Nuit (1973)
- Nel Buio Della Notte (1976)

== Visit to Cuba ==
De Céspedes in October 1968 attended the centennial of Cuba's struggle for independence celebrations. One of the events, attended by Fidel Castro, was held in Manzanillo, Cuba, where her grandfather, Carlos Manuel de Céspedes, on 10 October 1868, had made a speech against Spain which started the Ten Years' War. She also during that trip donated to the Cuban National Archives letters written by her grandfather between 1871 and 1874 to his wife.
