= Grand Park of Tirana =

Large park in Tirana, Albania, est. 1956

Coordinates: 41°18′46″N 19°49′20″E

Artificial Lake Of Tirana
- Liqeni Artificial i Tiranës
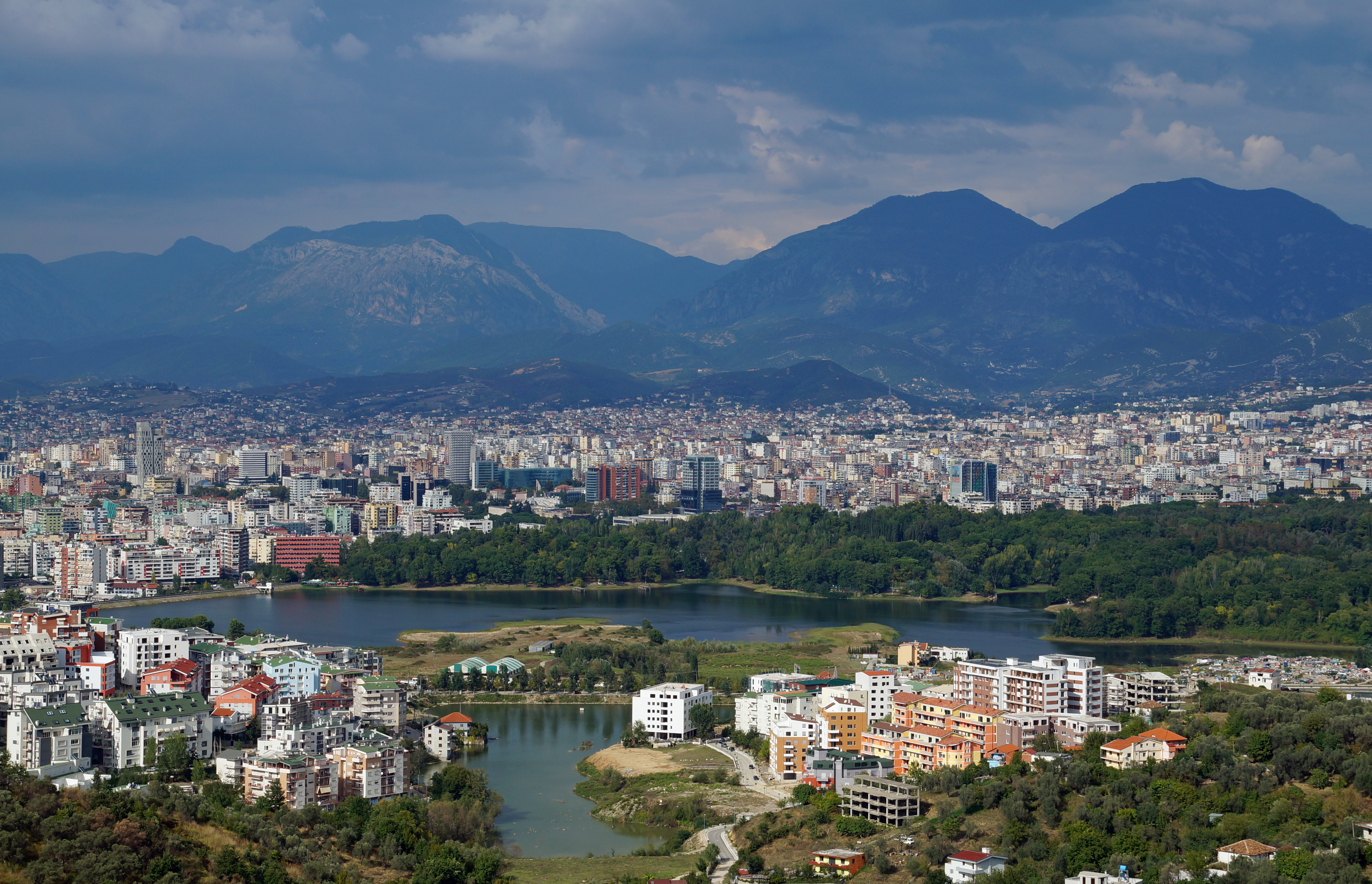
- Tirana as seen from the south.

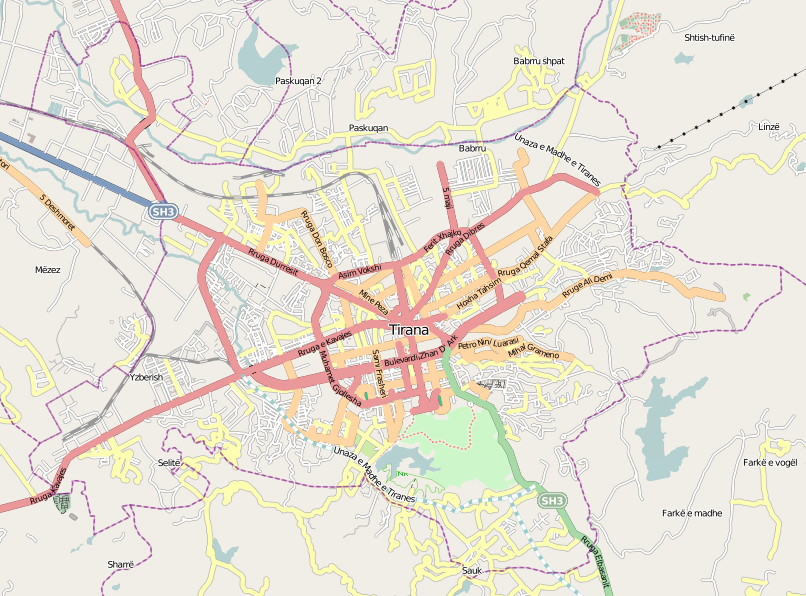
- Interactive map of Artificial Lake Of Tirana
- Location: Tirana, Tirana County, Albania
- Area: 289 ha (710 acres)

The Grand Park of Tirana (Albanian: Parku i Madh i Tiranës), or the Park on the Artificial Lake, also as Artificial Lake Of Tirana (Albanian: Liqeni Artificial i Tiranës), is a 289 hectare public park situated on the southern part of Tirana, Albania, and administered by the Agency of Parks and Recreation of the Municipality of Tirana.

The park includes an artificial lake and many other landmarks such as the St. Procopius Church, the Presidential Palace, and memorials to several Albanian personalities. It remains one of the most relaxing places in the city, despite increasing buildings being developed near the park, an early-morning run or promenade is a daily routines for many citizens. To the southern end of the Park, there is the Zoo and the Botanical Garden. The latter includes many flowers and plants that are common to the Albanian environment.

There are almost 120 species of trees, bushes and flowers. The Botanical Garden area is of 14.5 hectares and the lake's size is of 55 hectares, whereas the area of the Park itself is of 230 hectares.

The Park was built between 1955 and 1956 based on a Bulgarian plan and used to be called the Gogo stable, in a green area. The Park starts at the southern end of the Dëshmorët e Kombit Boulevard, after the University of Tirana, south of the main Skanderbeg Square. It was formerly called 'Park of St. Procopius' (Albanian: Parku i Shën Prokopit) from the St. Procopius Church, which is located in the area. In the internal parts, there can be found the memorials of 45 British and Australian soldiers fallen during World War II, as well as a memorial of hundreds of German soldiers from the same war.

== Setting and contents ==
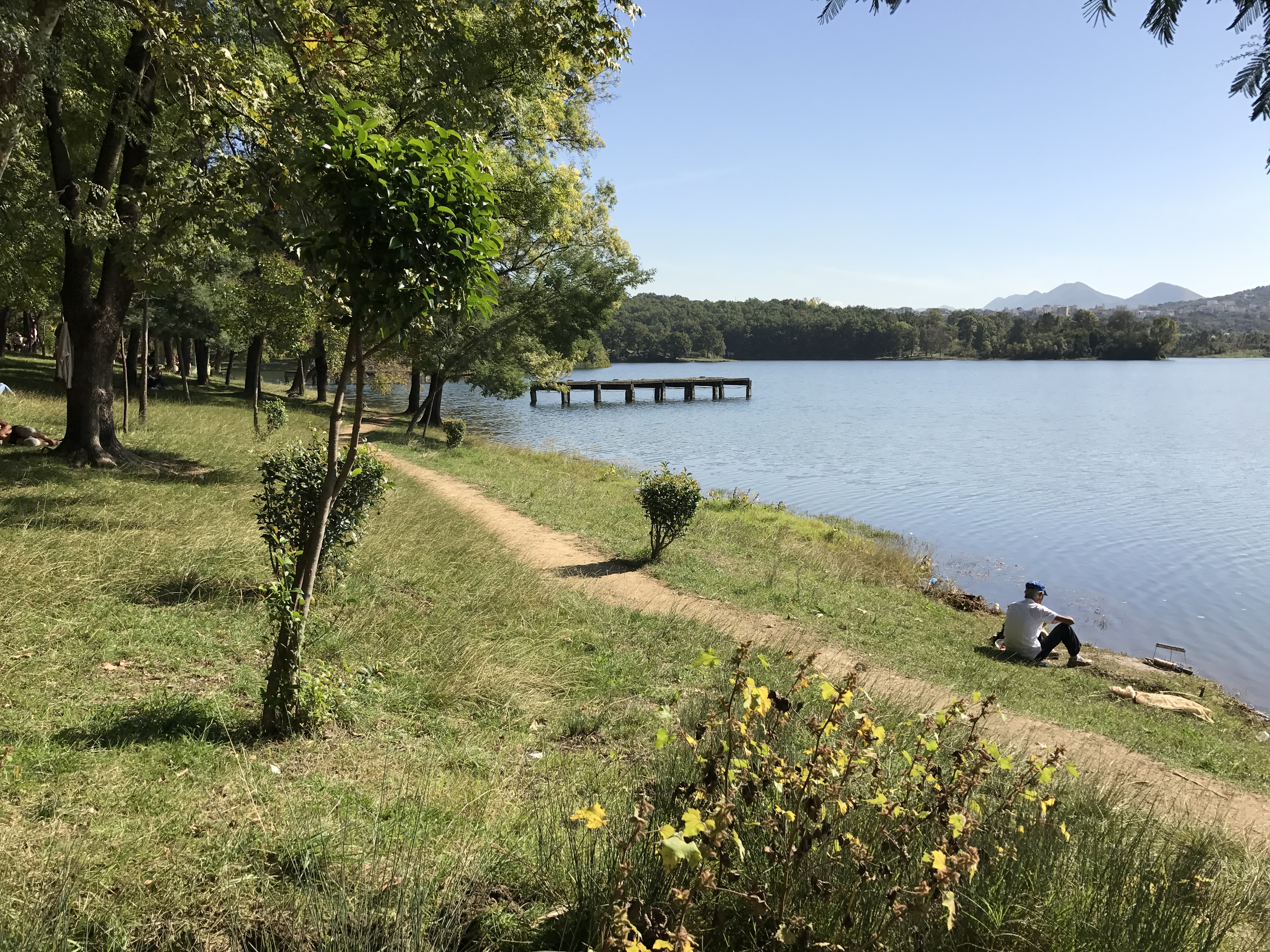
View of the lake

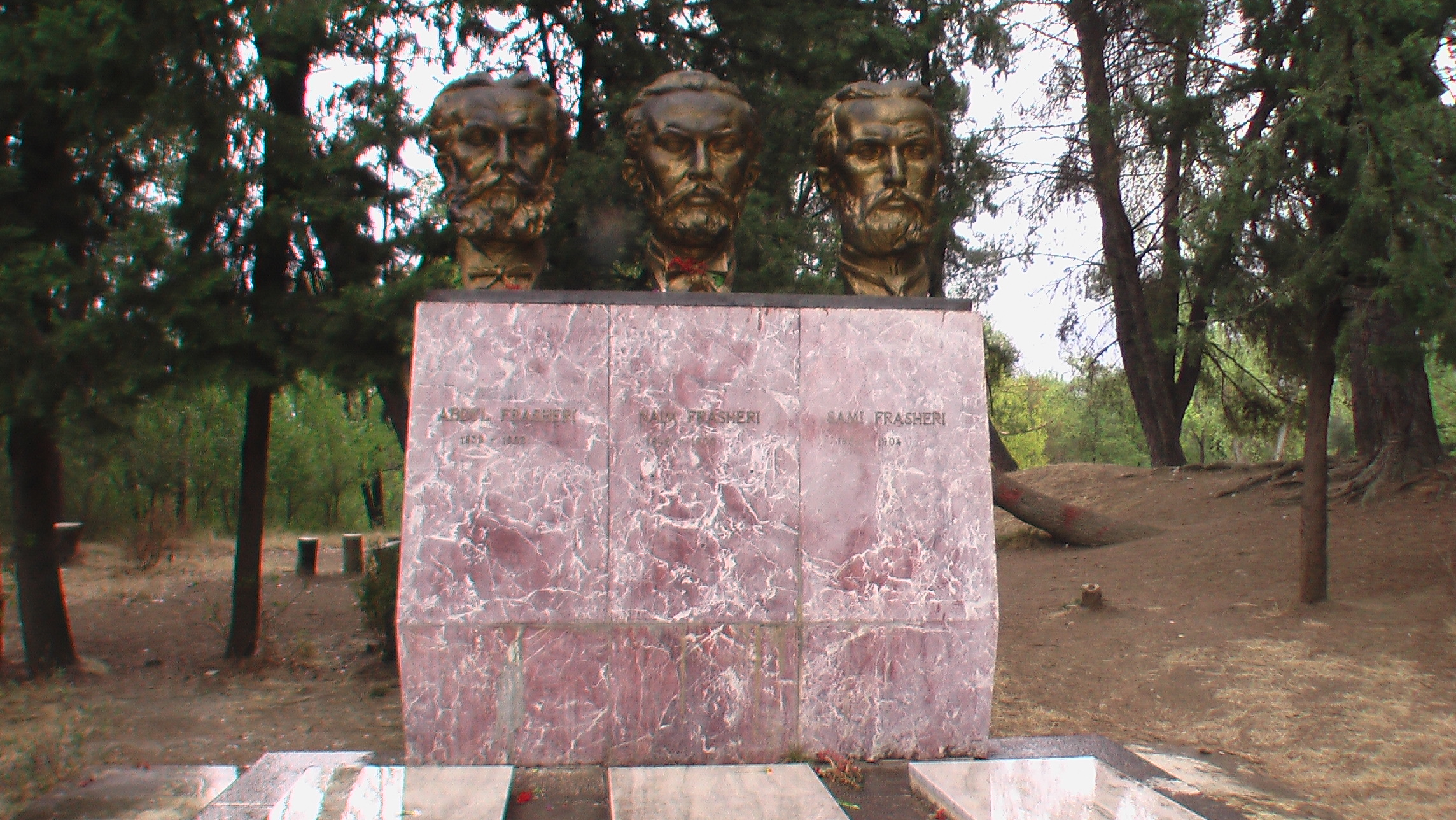
Monument of the Frashëri Brothers

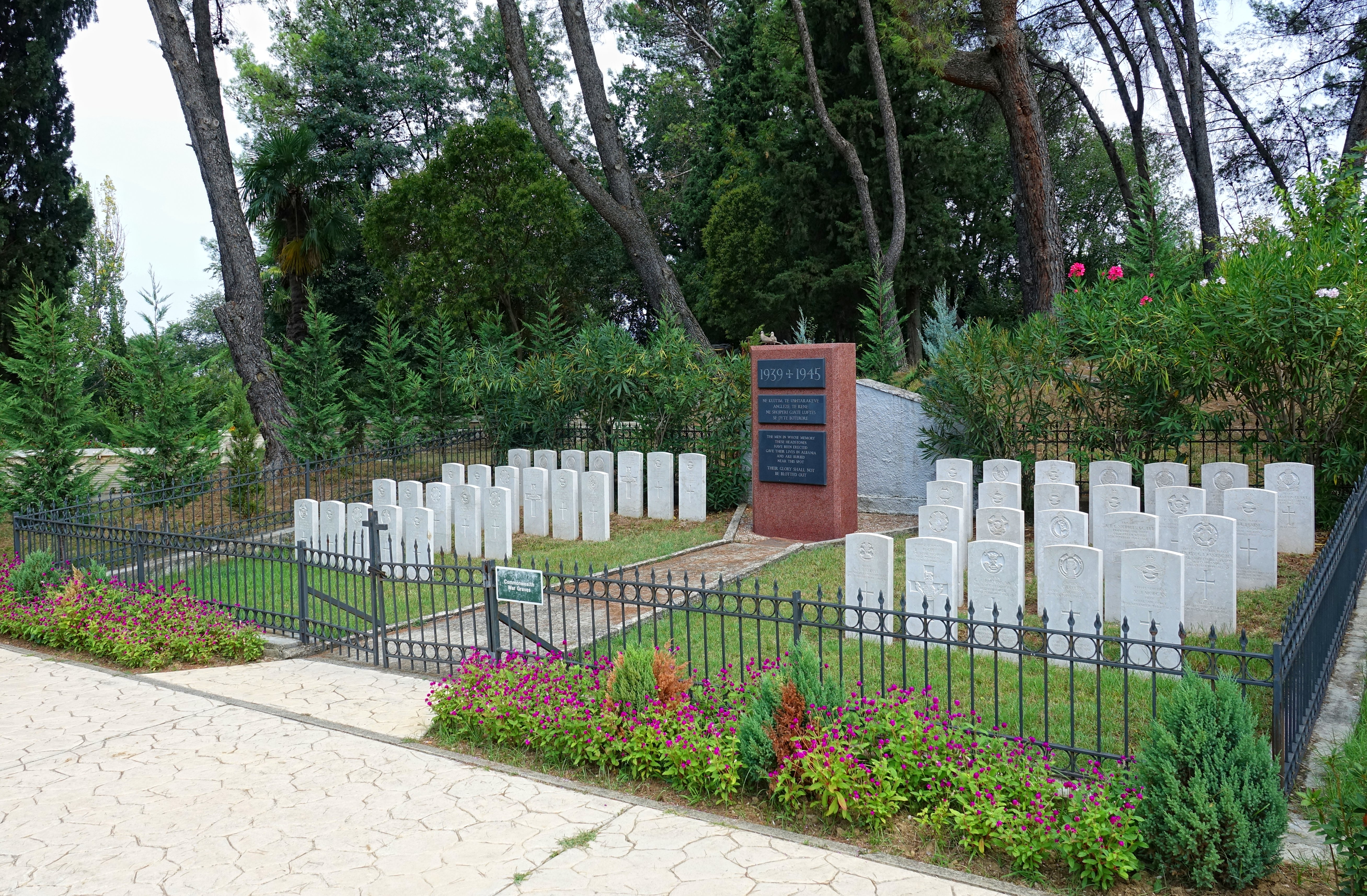
British and Australian WWII memorial

The park includes the Royal Palace located on the side and close to the Elbasan Street. The palace, whose building was started by Zog of Albania, served as a royal palace only once, for Italian King Victor Emmanuel III during his only visit to Albania in May 1941 as King of Albania. The palace had also served vicegerent Francesco Jacomoni and later the Fascist general Alberto Pariani. Now it is the official residence of the President of Albania.

The park was also home of the memorial to the mother of King Zog of Albania, Sadijé Toptani. The monument was destroyed by the communist regime in the 1950s and can now be enjoyed only in pictures. A wall has been built demarcating the park's boundary.

The park is otherwise called the "Lung of the City" due to the diversity of its plants. It also includes the Botanical Garden and the zoo and also a complex of swimming pools. In addition the Park has an amphitheatre, where various cultural activities occur especially in summer months. The artificial lake was a well known fishing and also swimming area during the communist period, with many small boats using the lake daily. Today, it is too polluted for any activities involving the water and it is advised to not swim in the lake. The lake was built from local waters in 1955 on volunteer work to build a 400 metres long dam that holds the waters from overflowing onto Tirana.

It also notably includes the Tombs of the Frashëri brothers, Abdyl Frashëri, Naim Frashëri and Sami Frashëri. Also, in 1998 the remains of Faik Konitza, former Minister of Albania to Washington, and publisher of the Albania magazine were brought from the United States and put in a tomb located at the park.

In 2020, Albania unveiled a Holocaust memorial at an entrance to the park, close to Mother Teresa Square, to honor the dead and the Albanians who protected Jews from the Nazis, with an inscription written in English, Hebrew, and Albanian that says "Albanians, Christians, and Muslims endangered their lives to protect and save the Jews."

== Rehabilitation and controversy ==
Children's playground

The Park has suffered extensively from problems of litter and pollutants and crime has also been reported in the area. In 2005, the Municipality organized the 'Green Fair', where major ideas were collected as how to fully rehabilitate the Park.

In 2008, a lakeside competition was held to come up with the best urban and ecologic masterplan for the future of the district, to create a new dense urban neighborhood with a park and public facilities at the shore of Lake. The masterplan consists of 225,000 square metres of housing, 60,000 square metres offices, 20,000 square metres public buildings, 60,000 square metres retail, 15,000 square metres of hotels and 20,000 square metres sport and recreational facilities and a car park. The redesign was scheduled to take place in 2010 with a total estimated investment of 600 million euros.

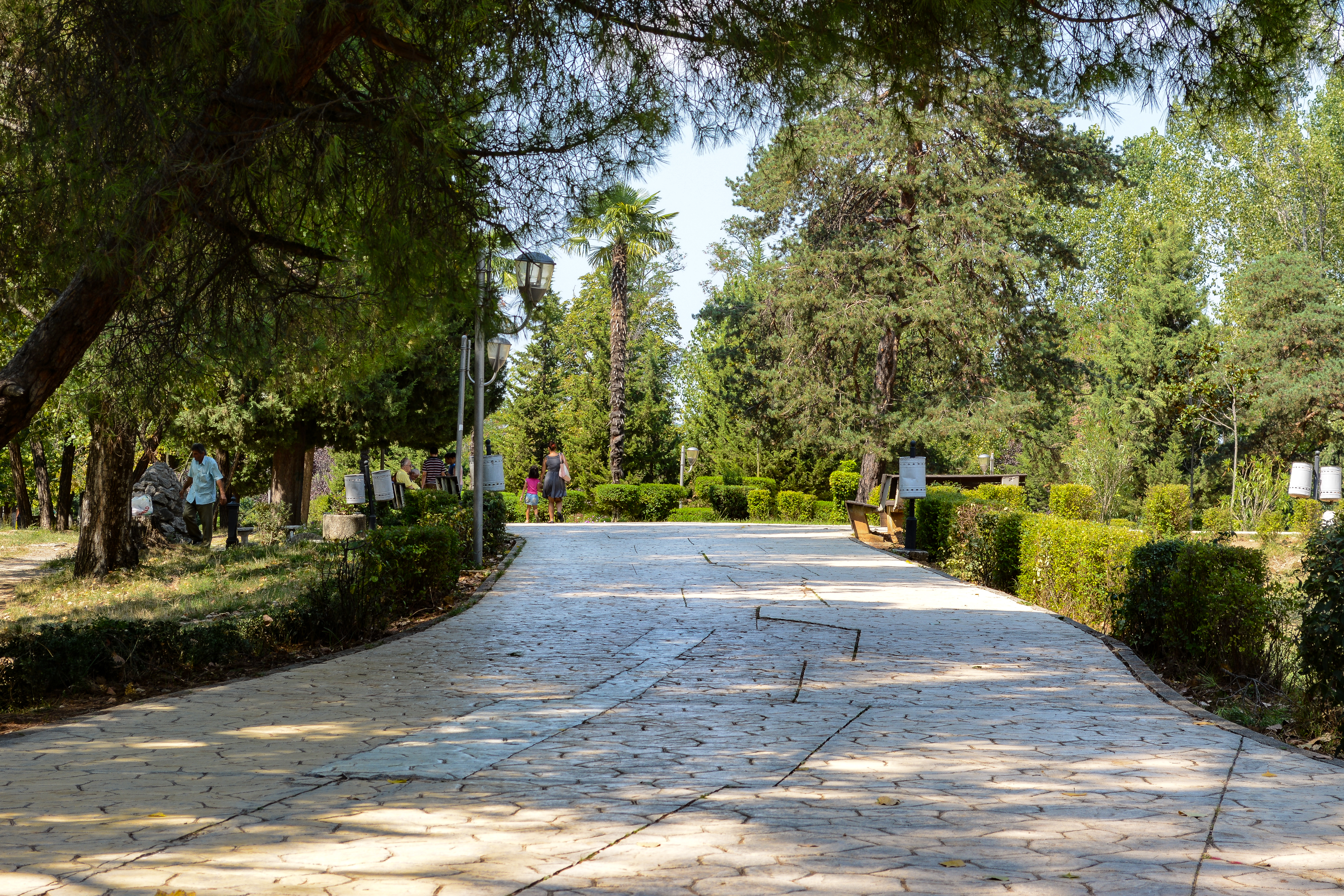
The entrance

The major constructions will reduce the size of the green area of the park, which has led to much controversy in the Albanian media as to the actual benefits to the citizens of Tirana.

The Botanical Gardens are set to be destroyed to build the new Tirana ring motorway.

In 2015, a competition was held to design the Park's entrance. It sparked great controversy because the original competition brief threatened the integrity of the park, a cherished public space in Tirana, with important construction requirements. A team of architects composed of three offices (BuildingBuilding, Elias Guenoun Architect and UHO) won the competition with a proposal consisting of less built elements and a strict limit between the park and city. This is currently in its study phase.
