= Guelfo Zamboni =

Italian diplomat

Italian Ambassador to Thailand
- In office 1956–1959
- Preceded by: Position established
- Succeeded by: Ezio Mizzan

Personal details
- Born: 1896 Santa Sofia, Italy
- Died: 1994 (aged 97–98) Rome, Italy

Guelfo Zamboni (1896–1994) was an Italian diplomat who saved hundreds of Jews during the Holocaust.

== Early life ==
Guelfo Zamboni was born in Santa Sofia, then part of Tuscany on 22 October 1896. The last of eight sons, he belonged to a family devoted to handicrafts. His parents wanted him to become a clergyman, but they died early in his life and left him an orphan. He decided to attend school when he grew up, facing the hardship of earning a living while studying. At 19 he fought as an infantryman in World War I, from 1916 to 1918, and was honored with a Bronze Medal of Military Valor and a War Merit Cross as he had been seriously wounded.

After the war he received a degree in Economics and Trade. In 1925 he took the exam that began him in his diplomatic career. Traditionally, the Italian Foreign Ministry had been dominated by the aristocracy and Zamboni was one of the first Italian diplomats to come from a modest background. Zamboni had been able enter the diplomatic corps because Benito Mussolini had abolished the requirement that those applying for a diplomatic career submit a notarized statement proving that they were from families in a high income bracket, a policy that had excluded Italians of middle-class or lower-class background from entering the diplomatic corps. After serving in the international treaty section of the Foreign Ministry, Zamboni had served in the Italian embassies in Tirana and Helsinki.

He went on to be an associate of Baron Bernardo Attolico, the Italian Ambassador in Berlin between 1935 and 40. Under the Germanophile Attolico's tutelage, he learned and became fluent in German. Zamboni complained that he had been prevented from marrying in his youth because of a Fascist law that prevented Italian citizens from marrying foreigners, which he called "another one of Mussolini's acts of foolishness." As the chargé d'affaires in Berlin, serving as the right-hand man to Baron Attolico, Zamboni found himself executing a policy of rapprochement with the Reich that he did not agree with, saying: "Even though the Germans were our allies, I had to salve my own conscience." On 11 July 1940 as the Italian chargé d'affaires, Zamboni submitted a formal note of protest to Baron Ernst von Weizsäcker against the German demand to have naval and air bases in French Morocco, which Mussolini saw as a threat to Italian ambitions to annex Algeria after the war. In response, Weizsäcker stated that the Reich had no intention of giving up its interest in bases in French Morocco, but was willing to accept Italian bases in Algeria as compensation. Besides for Attolico, Zamboni found another aristocratic patron in Viceré Marchese Francesco Jacomoni, a diplomat who was regarded as a lackey for the Foreign Minister Count Galeazzo Ciano. In 1939, after Italy occupied Albania, Jacomoni was appointed Viceroy of Albania and Zamboni ultimately followed his patron across the Strait of Otranto to Tirana. Had the Italian invasion of Greece in 1940 succeeded, Zamboni was due to be appointed governor of Epirus. Zamboni was unable to take up this appointment on the account of the Greeks defeating the Italian invasion.

== Rescuing the Jews of Thessaloniki ==
Following the German invasion of Greece in April 1941 and the occupation of the country by Nazi Germany, Italy, and Bulgaria, in 1942 Zamboni was appointed Consul General in Thessaloniki, the second largest city in Greece, which was occupied by Germany. The appointment was a promotion, as Thessaloniki was the headquarters of Army Group E that consisted of all the Wehrmacht forces in the Balkans, putting Zamboni in charge of relations with Field Marshal Alexander Löhr who served as the military governor of the areas occupied by Army Group E. The American historian Jonathan Steinberg called Zamboni a "tiny, lively and combative" man who spoke his Italian with a strong Romagna accent.

In November 1942, the Germans had shut down all consulates in Thessaloniki except the Italian one. For much of World War I, Thessaloniki, the largest Jewish city in the Balkans, had been occupied by the French Army (the "Salonika front") and many of the French soldiers had married Jewish women during the occupation. The French consulate in Thessaloniki had in 1941-42 repeatedly complained about the Germans harassing French citizens living in the city, causing the Germans to shut down all consulates except the Italian one to end this issue. Every week, Zamboni sent reports to Rome detailing social conditions in Thessaloniki that is one of the main sources for historians for this period.

At that time, Thessaloniki hosted the world's largest community (56,000) of Sephardi Jews, many of whom could claim familial connections to Italy. In June 1942, the Einsatzstab Reichsleiter Rosenberg began the systematic confiscation of the city's archives, libraries, and manuscripts, all of which were sent to the Institute for Jewish Studies in Frankfurt am Main. Between March and August 1943 the Germans deported nearly all of Thessaloniki's Jewish population to concentration and death camps. On 15 March 1943, the first train full of Jews left Thessaloniki for the Auschwitz death camp. As the only consulate left in Thessaloniki, many of the Jews put their hopes in Zamboni's goodwill. Every day, the consulate received dozens of Jews, asking for help. Taking pity, Zamboni decided to do something to help. In an interview in 1992, Zamboni recalled: "They would plead and cry, they would kneel and throw themselves at my feet and try to kiss my shoes. I was afraid that all this commotion would attract too much attention". On 27 March 1943, Zamboni asked Dr. Max Merten where the Jews were going, and was told that they were being sent to work in coal mines near Warsaw, but soon, Zamboni was able to establish that the Jews sent to Poland were in fact being exterminated.

Zamboni could not prevent the tragedy, but he did everything he could to rescue Jews of Thessaloniki. He also managed to extend provisional Italian citizenship to 280 Greek Jews. These certificates of Italian nationality, with the handwritten mark "provisional", were handed to many people who did not speak or understand Italian, made quasi-legal by claiming distant relatives. He later said:

I know they were false papers, but I marked them with the writing "provisional" waiting for a confirmation!

Their number eventually reached 350. Zamboni thus saved them from deportation as well.

Zamboni stated: "I couldn't demonstrate that these people were Italian citizens, but I could claim that the nationalisation procedure was under way."

One of the Jews whom Zamboni saved, Moise Nahmias recalled in a television interview: "At the consulate they gave me a certificate that was valid for one year that stated my name, date of birth and Italian nationality. In reality I was a Greek, born in Salonika and my only link to Italy was my wife's parents who were born in Trieste." The man in charge of deporting the Jews of Greece, SS Hauptsturmfuhrer Dieter Wisliceny criticized Zamboni, saying that he knew perfectly well that none of the Jews that Zamboni claimed were Italian citizens were really Italians, leading Zamboni to reply: "As long as the Italian flag flies here, under this flag I am the only one who decides what to do or what not to do".

Wisliceny believed that Zamboni had been bribed into issuing false Italian passports and spread rumors about he what claimed was "scandalous" corruption in the Italian consulate, but there is no evidence that Zamboni ever asked for or received financial rewards. In his study of the Axis occupation of Greece, the British historian Mark Mazower wrote that all of the evidence indicates that Zamboni had acted for humanitarian reasons.

Drita Djomo, a local woman with a Greek father and an Italian mother who worked as a translator at the consulate called the Italian consulate the "hideout of hope". She recalled in a 2017 interview: "With instructions from the consul I would falsify the papers and he would sign off on them. He was a very good man, he had no interest in Mussolini's fascism, and he helped many Jews. Everything would happen in absolute secrecy. The consul would never talk about what we were doing. Each of us knew our job. The man with the connections to incarcerated Greek Jews in the ghetto was Lucillo Merci, an Italian officer who worked as a German-Italian interpreter. We would make documents claiming that they had an Italian grandmother or something like that. Merci would then take them by car to the town of Plati in Imathia where the last German control checkpoint was and enter the areas occupied by Italy..."

Zamboni left Thessaloniki on 18 June 1943 to return to Rome. His work in rescuing Jews was continued by his successor, Giuseppe Castruccio. Castruccio would later organize a "rescue train" that transported Jews with Italian passports to Athens, which at that time was under Italian occupation. Zamboni's behaviour was observed by one of his coworkers, Captain Lucillo Merci, a liaison officer with the German forces and the author of a detailed diary of those events. (Note: Merci's diary is currently kept in Yad Vashem's archive.) By August 1943, 98% of the Jews who had been living in Thessaloniki in March were dead. Castruccio in a telegram to Rome wrote: "On August 14 the last train with Jews left Thessaloniki headed for Germany. On the 15th the SS officers left via plane. The Jewish community that existed before the discovery of America does not exist anymore".

== Post-war ==
After the war's end, Zamboni was put in charge of diplomatic missions in Baghdad and in Thailand. He was the Italian Ambassador in Bangkok until 1959. In 1963, he retired from the diplomatic corps and lived in obscurity for decades afterward.

In 1992, the State of Israel awarded Guelfo Zamboni with the title of "Righteous among the Nations", which is awarded to those who saved Jews during the Holocaust at personal risk to themselves and who acted for purely altruistic reasons. He was thus awarded a place in Jerusalem's Yad Vashem. In 2002, Ehud Gol, the Israeli Ambassador in Italy, traveled to Santa Sofia to place a stone in Zamboni's memory.

Guelfo Zamboni never asked for recognition for his aid and remained quite unknown in Italy until the eve of his 95th birthday (1992), when he gave his first interview after being awarded the title of "Righteous among the Nations". In 2008, the Italian Embassy in Athens published the book Ebrei di Salonicco 1943, i documenti dell'umanità italiana, edited by Antonio Ferrari (Corriere della Sera), Alessandra Coppola (University of Padua), and Jannis Chrisafis (a Greek journalist). This book reports the telex sent to Rome by Zamboni. His story also inspired the theatrical work Salonicco '43 by Ferdinando Ceriani, Gian Paolo Cavarai and Antonio Ferrari, previewed at the University of Tel Aviv on 23 September 2008 during a celebratory evening organized by the Italian Cultural Institute.

== See also ==
- Ministry of Foreign Affairs (Italy)
- Foreign relations of Italy
- History of the Jews in Thessaloniki

== Sources ==
- Achtner, Wolfgang (12 March 1994). "Obituary: Guelfo Zamboni". The Independent.
- Bitti, Angelo (1291). Esce dagli archivi, un pezzo alla volta, la tragica storia. Società italiana per lo studio della storia contemporanea (SISSCO) [Italian Society for the Study of Contemporary History].
- Carpi, Daniel (2002). "A New Approach to Some Episodes in the History of the Jews in Salonika during the Holocaust. Memory, Myth, Documentation". In Carpi, Daniel (ed.). Proceedings of the International Conference on The Jewish Communities in the Balkans and Turkey in the 19th and 20th Centuries Through the End of World War II. Vol. 2. ISBN 965338045-1.
- Goda, Norman (August 1994). "Hitler's Demand for Casablanca in 1940: Incident or Policy?". The International History Review. 16 (3): 491–510. doi:10.1080/07075332.1994.9640685.
- "An intimate chronicle of Sephardic Jewish history". The Economist. 2 January 2020.
- Mazower, Mark (1993). Inside Hitler's Greece The Experience of Occupation 1941-1944. New Haven: Yale University Press. ISBN 978-030005804-8.
- Mazower, Mark (2006). Salonica, City of Ghosts: Christians, Muslims, and Jews, 1430-1950. New York: Vintage Books. ISBN 037572738-8.
- Steinberg, Jonathan (1990). All or Nothing: The Axis and the Holocaust 1941-43. London: Routledge. ISBN 978-041504757-9.
- Tzimas, Stravros (12 December 2017). "Italian Consul Guelfo Zamboni: Thessaloniki's Schindler". I Kathimerini.
- Viroli, Aldo (12 January 2009). "Zamboni, "Giusto" romagnolo". La Voce di Romagna.
