= Zoopark Tirana =

Coordinates: 41°18′28″N 19°48′34″E

- Official logo

- Interactive map of Zoopark Tirana
- Date opened: 1961
- Location: Tirana, Albania
- Land area: 6.09 ha (15.0 acres)
- Owner: Tirana Municipality
- Management: Agjencia e Parqeve dhe Rekreacionit
- Website: APR Tirana

Zoopark Tirana (Albanian: Kopshti Zoologjik i Tiranës) is a public zoo located in Tirana, Albania. It is the only zoo of its kind in the country. Built during 1960–1961, the zoo is concentrated in an area of 6.09 ha (15.0 acres) in the southern part of the city, between the Grand Park and the Botanical Gardens.

== Infrastructure ==
Presently the infrastructure of the zoo is in a bad state, needing funds for reparations and animal care. There are not many animals on display, just some: bears, lions, llamas, monkeys, wolves, foxes, and some birds the zoo is still popular with local visitors and children who come here to play. After 2022 the zoo has been renovated and improved and now houses lions, tigers, orangutans, ostriches, bears, zebras, peacocks, wolves, lemurs, snakes, turtles, roe deers, parrots, flamingos, alpacas, llamas, balkan lynx, wild boars, and owls. Around 160 animals from 30 species are to be found.

== Controversy ==
The zoo has been described by many visitors as an animal prison, mostly because of the bad conditions in which the animals live.

On 2015 it was closed because a video footage was released, in which a bull attacked a donkey and nothing was done to help the animal. Animal Activists and Environmentalists always pressured the local authorities to close the zoo down and end the cruelty towards the animals kept there.

Tirana's Municipality recently announced its intention to extend the zoo into a park, creating better conditions for the animals. The natural landscape of the zoo full of trees and green spaces has been tarnished considerably with the rise of new apartment flats in the area.
