= Dainelli =

Dainelli is an Italian surname. Notable people with the surname include:

- Dario Dainelli (born 1979), Italian footballer
- Giotto Dainelli (1878–1968), Italian geographer, geologist, paleontologist, traveller, and writer
- Luca Dainelli, Italian diplomat
- Rosa Dainelli (1901–1973), Italian doctor who worked in Ethiopia during World War II
