= Open Theatre of Tirana =

Open-air theatre in Tirana, Albania

- Interactive map of Open Theatre of Tirana
- Address: Grand Park; Tirana; Albania
- Coordinates: 41°18′50″N 19°49′14″E
- Current use: Multiuse

Construction
- Opened: 1974
- Rebuilt: 2018

Website
- "Teatri Mirush Kabashi", City of Tirana website (in Albanian)

The Open Theatre of Tirana is an open-air theatre within the Grand Park of Tirana, Albania. The theatre is called an "amphitheatre" by locals, mainly because it is in the open, and also because of its almost semi-circular form, which recalls the typical shapes of the Roman theatres (although not amphitheatres).

== History ==
In 1973, architect-engineer Temo Vito projected the theatre within the Grand Park of Tirana. He did so taking into consideration the green park around the area. The main problem were some century-old olive trees, which, according to local beliefs could not be cut. This was circumvented by transferring those olive trees in a nearby area, work that was conducted under the supervision of agronomist Abedin Çiço. Construction of the theatre was performed by the government-owned company "21 dhjetori", and the theatre was inaugurated in spring 1974. It has a stage, the podium, dressing rooms for the artists and a technical room for projectors, and can be used as a concert stage, as well as a movie theatre.

After the 1990s the summer theatre was abandoned and the seats were almost fully ruined by the elements. The town hall of Tirana started the rehabilitation in the fall of 2017 and on 30 May 2018 the theatre re-opened, with a night concert given by the Albanian Armed Forces band, the orchestra of the Radio Televizioni Shqiptar, led by Noorman Widjaja, violinist Olen Cesari, and the school of ballet students, for a total number of 400 artists participating in the event. The spectacle was followed by another concert, two days later, by the Greek singer, George Dalaras.
