= Eugenio Rubino =

Italian diplomat

Italian Ambassador to Philippines
- In office 5 October 1961 – 30 October 1966
- Preceded by: Paolo Arturo Coppini
- Succeeded by: Dante Matacotta

Italian Ambassador to Thailand
- In office 1969–1972
- Preceded by: Andrea Ferrero
- Succeeded by: Diego Soro

Italian Ambassador to Vietnam
- In office 27 February 1972 – 2 May 1975
- Preceded by: Vincenzo Tornetta
- Succeeded by: Gabriele Menegatti

Italian Ambassador to Uganda
- In office 10 March 1977 – 19 July 1981
- Preceded by: Renzo Falaschi
- Succeeded by: Michele Martinez

Personal details
- Born: 20 August 1916 Trapani, Sicily, Italy

Eugenio Rubino (born 20 August 1916) was an Italian diplomat. He was called "one of the most prestigious sons of the city Trapani."

== Biography ==
Eugenio Rubino was born on 20 August 1916 in Trapani, on the west coast of Sicily, in Italy.

He became a diplomat in the 1950s. He was Italian Ambassador to Philippines, an office which he held from 1961 until 1966. During his mission to the Philippines, he founded, together with Filipino Ambassador Proceso E. Sebastian, the Philippine Italian Association, which was established on 19 February 1962.

He then became Italian Ambassador to Thailand, an office which he kept from 1969 until 1972. On 27 February 1972 he was appointed Italian Ambassador to Vietnam, keeping this office until 1975.

Rubino was nominated Italian Ambassador to Uganda on 10 March 1977. He arrived in Uganda in March 1977, presenting his credentials to Idi Amin on 18 March 1977. During his mission to Uganda, he initially resided in Kampala. He held this office until 1981.

He went out of service on 1 September 1981.

In the 1990s he founded the Associazione degli ex studenti del Liceo classico Ximenes in Trapani, Italy.
