= Mario Prunas =

Italian diplomat

Italian Ambassador to Thailand
- In office 1974–1978
- Preceded by: Diego Soro
- Succeeded by: Francesco Ripandelli

Italian Ambassador to Sweden
- In office 1979–1983
- Preceded by: Luigi Valdettaro della Rocchetta
- Succeeded by: Stefano Rastrelli

Personal details
- Born: Cagliari, Italy
- Died: 19 August 1982 Stockholm, Sweden

Mario Prunas (died on 19 August 1982) was an Italian diplomat.

He was a nephew of diplomat Renato Prunas (born 21 June 1892 in Cagliari, died on 25 December 1951 in Cairo), Secretary General of the Ministry of Foreign Affairs from 1943 until 1946.

== Biography ==
From 1955 to 1963 he was second class delegation secretary in Cairo, where he was accredited on 7 October 1959 as a delegation councilor.

From 1974 to 1978 he was Italian ambassador to Bangkok.

From 1979 to 1983 he was Italian ambassador to Stockholm.

== See also ==
- Ministry of Foreign Affairs (Italy)
- Foreign relations of Italy
