= Adalberto Figarolo di Gropello =

Italian diplomat (born 1910)

Italian Ambassador to Pakistan
- In office 11 June 1962 – 2 December 1964
- Preceded by: Sergio Koliancich
- Succeeded by: Luca Dainelli

Italian Ambassador to Norway
- In office 18 November 1964 – 5 October 1967
- Preceded by: Silvio Daneo
- Succeeded by: Raffaele Clementi di San Michele

Italian Ambassador to Algeria
- In office 1967–1971
- Preceded by: Paolo Tallarigo di Zagarise e Sersale
- Succeeded by: Alessandro Marieni

Personal details
- Born: 24 February 1910 Barza d'Ispra (Varese)

Adalberto Figarolo di Gropello, Count of Gropello (born 24 February 1910, date of death unknown) was an Italian diplomat.

== Biography ==
Born in Barza d'Ispra (Varese) on 24 February 1910, Adalberto Figarolo di Gropello earned a degree in law at the University of Florence in 1933.

Di Gropello was the 7th Italian Ambassador to Pakistan. He became Italian Ambassador to Norway in 1964, an office which he held until 1967. He later became Italian Ambassador to Algeria (1967 – 1971).

== See also ==
- Ministry of Foreign Affairs (Italy)
- Foreign relations of Italy
