= Ezio Mizzan =

Italian diplomat

- Ezio Mizzan (right) and American actor Kirk Douglas at an informal dinner at Prince and Princess Sanidh Rangsit, Thailand in 1964

Italian Ambassador to Thailand
- In office 24 February 1959 – 21 August 1965
- Preceded by: Guelfo Zamboni
- Succeeded by: Andrea Ferrero

Italian Ambassador to Pakistan
- In office 23 August 1966 – 26 March 1969
- Preceded by: Luca Dainelli
- Succeeded by: Franco Bounous

Italian Ambassador to China (chargé)
- In office November 1950 – December 1951
- Preceded by: Sergio Fenoaltea
- Succeeded by: Antonino Restivo

Personal details
- Born: 12 January 1905 Trieste, Austria-Hungary
- Died: 26 March 1969 (aged 64) Rawalpindi, Pakistan
- Spouse: Enrica Galluppi di Cirella (m. 1935)
- Children: 1
- Awards: Grand Officer of the Order of Merit of the Italian Republic

Ezio Mizzan (12 January 1905 – 26 March 1969) was an Italian diplomat. After graduating in law in Rome, Mizzan started his career at the Farnesina. He was sent as consul to Rio and Annaba, and acted as a diplomat in the Italian Embassies in Bucharest, Brussels, Berlin and Paris. In the middle of 1946 he was sent to China, where he was initially appointed consul of Hankou. Mizzan lived firsthand the advent of Communism in China, where he remained, as first secretary of the Italian embassy and the de facto leader of diplomatic relations, after the Italian ambassador fled to Italy in 1950.

In 1951, fearing political repercussions for Italy and for the lives of the Italian diplomats in China, who were still stationed in Nanjing, China's former capital and the claimed capital of the Republic of China, he advised Italy to make a firm choice, either formally recognizing China, and thence moving him to Beijing, China's new capital, or breaking all relations and moving all diplomats out. Italy chose to dismantle the embassy and Mizzan left for Hong Kong at the end of 1951. He then became the second Italian Ambassador to Thailand (1959–1965) and the ninth Italian Ambassador to Pakistan (1966–1969).

== Biography ==
Ezio Mizzan was born in Trieste, now Italy, at the time under Austro-Hungarian rule, on 12 January 1905, to Giovanni, a pharmacist, and Gilda Rovis, into an Italian family originally from Pisino, Istria.

After graduating from the University of Rome, he pursued his studies abroad, and in 1932 started his career as a diplomat. He was employed for short periods of time at the Ministry of Foreign Affairs in Rome, where he was later employed to solve the problems relating to the Julian March. Mizzan was sent as consul to Rio de Janeiro, Brazil, and later became Italian consul in Annaba, Algeria. He then worked as a diplomat at the Italian Embassies in Bucharest, Brussels, Berlin and Paris. In 1941 he was the Italian consul of Wrocław (then known as Breslau).

In the middle of 1946 he was sent to China, and was appointed consul of Hankou. Mizzan arrived in China at 41, and went on to become the first secretary (Primo Segretario di Legazione) of the Italian Embassy in Nanjing. In China, Mizzan lived firsthand the advent of Communism. He was the "highest Italian functionary in China among those who, among thousands difficulties, resisted and held their place after the outbreak of the war in Korea, albeit without recognition from Beijing." Mizzan found himself in the lead of the diplomatic relations between Italy and China after the Italian ambassador fled to Italy in 1950. He and the other functionaries weren't recognized and weren't given privileged status by the Chinese authorities, who considered them simply foreign citizens, if not "spies from hostile foreign governments". Neither the functionaries nor their belongings nor the embassy buildings were given the privileged status normally acknowledged to diplomats. After the outbreak of the war in Korea, tension arose. His position and the other diplomats' became uncomfortable, and the Italian state, after Mizzan's advice and the following consultation of former Italian ambassadors and scholars, decided to proceed with the burning of the archives containing political correspondence in Shanghai. As reported in a telegram sent by Mizzan to Rome in October 1950, the absence of immunity might've put him and his colleagues in an uncomfortable position, should they be caught unawares. The archives included correspondence from 1929 to 1943, and older one, and constituted "a cumbersome reminder of the past."

In September of that year, seven foreign citizens were accused of plotting against the new Chinese government and arrested by the Communists. Among them were two Italians, the bishops Tarcisio Martina and Antonio Riva, the latter of whom was condemned to death after a summary trial, and executed by firing squad in August 1951.

In January 1950 Mizzan wrote a laconic message in English, entrusting it to the British, since they were the only ones to have a radio to communicate out of China. In February 1951 he reported from Nanjing that in the absence of formal Italian recognition of Communist China, his permanence in China's old capital, and the claimed capital of the Republic of China, might create inconveniences of political nature, beside putting his and the other diplomats' lives at risk. He advised Palazzo Chigi to make a firm choice, either proceeding with the formal recognition, thus moving him to Beijing, the new capital, or breaking all relationships with China, moving all diplomats out. As Italy wavered over the decision, Mizzan telegraphed that the communist police was restricting ever more his activity and movements. Italy initially leaned towards recognition, led by Sforza, who was sentimentally bond to China. In February, Rome prepared a telegram in which Carlo Sforza recognized China, and expressed his willingness to establish diplomatic relations, asking Zhou Enlai to turn to Mizzan as head of diplomatic relations ad interim. However, as McCarthy made his speech in February 1950, it emerged that the United Kingdom, and later the Netherlands, didn't gain much from recognizing China, and the United States, after initially showing support, advised Italy that recognizing China wasn't a good idea, Italy chose to avoid recognition, and finally proceeded with the closure of the office. Mizzan barely managed to obtain a visa out of China, while Italy telegraphed that the archives should be sent to Shanghai, when possible, or otherwise burned. In December 1951 he finally reached Hong Kong. With the recalling of Mizzan, Italy's chargé d'affaires in China, the collapsing diplomatic network between Italy and China definitively ended in 1952.

He then became Counsellor of the Italian Embassy in New Delhi. On 24 February 1959 he became Ambassador of Italy to Thailand, holding this post until August 1965. He left Bangkok on 21 August 1965. He was then named Ambassador of Italy to Pakistan, while the latter was under the rule of Field Marshal Ayub Khan. Mizzan was received in Karachi by the Pakistani authorities. He held this post until his death, on 26 March 1969.

Mizzan was made a Grand Officer of the Order of Merit of the Italian Republic by the Italian State on 2 June 1965.

== Marriage and progeny ==
On 6 February 1935 he married Enrica Galluppi di Cirella. The marriage produced offspring. The couple eventually split and his ex-wife later remarried to Bonifacio Marquess of Canossa, Count of Canossa and Lord of Grezzano.

== See also ==
- Ministry of Foreign Affairs (Italy)
- Foreign relations of Italy
