= Roberto Toscano =

Italian diplomat

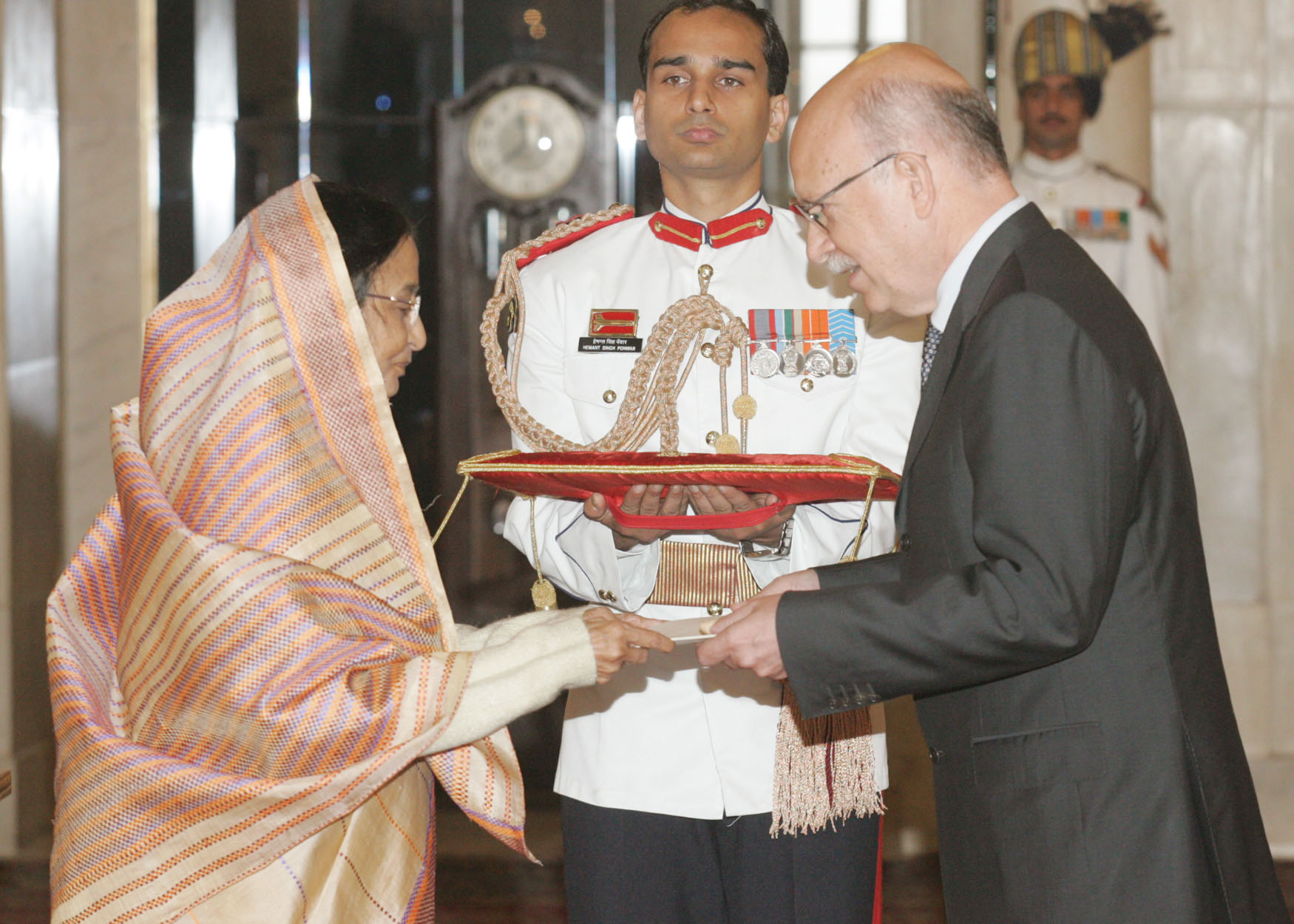
- The Ambassador of Italy to India, Mr. Roberto Toscano presenting his credentials to the President, Smt. Pratibha Devisingh Patil, at Rashtrapati Bhavan, in New Delhi on November 10, 2008

Italian ambassador to India
- In office 2008–2010
- Preceded by: Antonio Armellini
- Succeeded by: Giacomo Sanfelice di Monteforte

Italian ambassador to Iran
- In office 2003–2008
- Preceded by: Riccardo Sessa
- Succeeded by: Alberto Bradanini

Personal details
- Born: October 3, 1943 (age 83) Parma
- Education: University of Parma
- Profession: Diplomat

Roberto Toscano (born October 3, 1943) is an Italian diplomat who served as ambassador to India and Iran.

== Biography ==
Toscano was born in Parma on October 3, 1943, and holds a law degree from the University of Parma and an MA from the School of Advanced International Studies of Johns Hopkins University, which he attended as a Fulbright scholar. Between 1987 and 1988, he was a fellow at the Center for International Affairs of Harvard University.

Toscano was ambassador from Italy to India from 2008 to 2010, after having been for five years, from 2003 to 2008, ambassador from Italy to Iran. From 1999 to 2003, he was head of the Analysis and Planning Unit of the Italian Ministry of Foreign Affairs and chaired the OECD Development Assistance Committee network on conflict, peace, and development cooperation. Previously he served, as a career diplomat, in Chile (in 1973 at the time of the Pinochet coup), USSR, Spain, United States and at the Permanent Representation of Italy to the United Nations in Geneva.

With Piero De Masi he is among the main interviewees of the 2018 Nanni Moretti documentary Santiago, Italia, on the activities of the Italian Embassy in Santiago, given the central role played by the two diplomats in harbouring hundreds of Augusto Pinochet opposers, helping them seek refuge in Italy.

He has published several books on international affairs and from 2000 to 2003, he was visiting professor in international relations at LUISS University.

From 2013 to 2017, he worked as a columnist with the Italian daily newspaper La Stampa and from 2017 to 2019 with the daily newspaper La Repubblica.

== Works ==
- Toscano, Roberto (1989). Soviet Human Rights Policy and Perestroika. Cambridge, MA: University Press of America. ISBN 0819174084.
- Toscano, Roberto (2000). Il volto del nemico. La sfida dell'etica nelle relazioni internazionali. Milano: Guerini e Associati. ISBN 88-8335-107-X.
- Toscano, Roberto (2006). La violenza, le regole. Torino: Einaudi. ISBN 88-06-18228-5.
- Toscano, Roberto; Jahanbegloo, Ramin (2009). Beyond Violence. Principles for an Open Century. New Delhi: Har-Anand Publications.
- Toscano, Roberto (2009). Between terrorism and global governance: essays on ethics, violence and international law. New Delhi: Har-Anand Publications. ISBN 978-81-241-1485-8.

== Honours ==
Order of Merit of the Italian Republic 1st Class / Knight Grand Cross – February 9, 2010

== See also ==
- Ministry of Foreign Affairs (Italy)
- Foreign relations of Italy

Preceded by Antonio Armellini	Italian Ambassador to India; 2008 - 2010	Succeeded by Giacomo Sanfelice di Monteforte
Preceded by Riccardo Sessa	Italian Ambassador to Iran; 2003 - 2008	Succeeded by Antonio Bradanini
