= Piero De Masi =

Italian ambassador (1937–2021)

Ambassador

Personal details
- Born: June 6, 1937
- Died: October 12, 2021 (aged 84)
- Education: University of Rome & College of Europe
- Awards: Officer of the Order of Merit of the Italian Republic - 1978

Piero De Masi (June 6, 1937 – October 12, 2021) was an Italian ambassador, known for his contribution in saving hundreds of Chileans fleeing the violence that followed the 1973 Pinochet coup.

== Education ==
He graduated in Political Science from the University of Rome on July 12, 1960, and received a graduate degree in High European Studies from the College of Europe in Bruges, Belgium.

== Career ==
De Masi began his diplomatic career in 1964 and served in several diplomatic posts, including Strasbourg, Durban, Santiago, Prague, Madrid and Berlin. He was the first Italian Ambassador to Namibia from 1990 to 1996 and then Italian General Consul in Boston (1998–2002) and Amsterdam (2002–2004).

=== Chile coup ===
In 1973, during the Pinochet coup, De Masi was Chargé d'Affaires at the Italian Embassy in Santiago. He was the highest-ranking official, given the ambassador's absence. Immediately after the coup, some people (including families with children) started seeking refuge at the embassy. De Masi asked the Ministry of Foreign Affairs for instructions, but did not get an answer. For several months the number of fleeing Chileans taking refuge at the embassy kept increasing. De Masi was forced to use his own money to buy numerous mattresses, to offer a bed to the many guests, who were numbering more than 50 per room. Thanks to De Masi's efforts, hundreds of opponents of the Chilean regime escaped death and could leave for exile in Italy.

The story of the Italian Embassy in Santiago was the subject of the 2018 documentary film Santiago, Italia, by director Nanni Moretti, in which De Masi, together with Roberto Toscano, has a central role.

He died in Umbria, Italy on October 12, 2021.

== Works ==
- Piero De Masi, Santiago. 1 febbraio 1973-27 gennaio 1974, Roma, Bonanno Editore, 2013.
- Piero De Masi, Santiago. 1 de febrero de 1973 -27 de enero de 1974, Editorial Cuadernos Del Laberinto, Editorial Cuadernos Del Laberinto, 2017.

== Honors ==
Officer of the Order of Merit of the Italian Republic - 1978

Hero of the Republic of Chile, 2015

== See also ==
- Ministry of Foreign Affairs (Italy)
- Foreign relations of Italy
