= List of ambassadors of Italy to Algeria =

Coordinates: 36.762642°N 3.029049°E

Ambassador of Italy to Algeria
- Emblem of Italy
- Incumbent; Vacant
- Inaugural holder: Fernando Natale
- Formation: 1962

The Italian ambassador in Algiers is the official representative of the Government in Rome to the Government of Algeria.

== List of representatives ==
| Diplomatic accreditation | Ambassador | Observations | List of prime ministers of Italy | List of heads of state of Algeria | Term end |
|---|---|---|---|---|---|
| October 5, 1962 | Fernando Natale | | Fernando Tambroni | Ferhat Abbas | 1963 |
| February 1, 1963 | Gian Lorenzo Betteloni | | Giovanni Leone | Mohammed Ahmed Ben Bella | 1964 |
| October 30, 1964 | Paolo Tallarigo di Zagarise e Sersale | | Giovanni Leone | Mohammed Ahmed Ben Bella | 1967 |
| October 10, 1967 | Adalberto Figarolo di Gropello | | Giovanni Leone | Houari Boumedienne | 1971 |
| October 3, 1971 | Alessandro Marieni | | Emilio Colombo | Houari Boumedienne | 1973 |
| September 15, 1973 | Umberto Bozzini | | Mariano Rumor | Houari Boumedienne | 1979 |
| April 30, 1979 | Riccardo Pignatelli della Leonessa | | Francesco Cossiga | Chadli Bendjedid | 1985 |
| July 16, 1985 | Michelangelo Jacobucci | | Bettino Craxi | Chadli Bendjedid | 1988 |
| January 12, 1989 | Antonio Badini | | Giulio Andreotti | Chadli Bendjedid | 1992 |
| February 6, 1993 | Patrizio Schimidlin | | Carlo Azeglio Ciampi | Muhammad Boudiaf | 1996 |
| September 28, 1996 | Francesco de Courten | | Romano Prodi | Liamine Zéroual | 1998 |
| July 7, 1998 | Antonio Armellini | | Massimo D’Alema | Liamine Zéroual | 2000 |
| September 17, 2000 | Romualdo Bettini | | Giuliano Amato | Abdelaziz Bouteflika | 2004 |
| March 15, 2004 | Giovan Battista Verderame | (*December 19, 1945 in Menfi), In 1999 he became Italian ambassador to Hungary | Silvio Berlusconi | Abdelaziz Bouteflika | 2007 |
| September 18, 2007 | Giampaolo Cantini | | Silvio Berlusconi | Abdelaziz Bouteflika | January 30, 2012 |
| January 25, 2012 | Michele Giacomelli | | Mario Monti | Abdelaziz Bouteflika | |
| October 3, 2016 | Pasquale Ferrara | (1958) | Matteo Renzi | Abdelaziz Bouteflika | |
| November 26, 2020 | Giovanni Pugliese | | Giuseppe Conte | Abdelmadjid Tebboune | 2021 |
