= Franco Bounous =

Italian diplomat

Italian Ambassador to Cyprus
- In office 9 June 1965 – 29 September 1969
- Preceded by: Mario Battisti
- Succeeded by: Alessandro Capece Minutolo di Bugnano

Italian Ambassador to Pakistan
- In office 3 October 1969 – 15 March 1973
- Preceded by: Ezio Mizzan
- Succeeded by: Oberto Fabiani

Personal details
- Died: 27 April 1987
- Spouse: Alba de Céspedes y Bertini (m. 1945)
- Awards: Grand Officer of the Order of Merit of the Italian Republic

Franco Bounous (died 27 April 1987) was an Italian diplomat.

Bounous was the 3rd Italian Ambassador to Cyprus. Later, he became the 10th Italian Ambassador to Pakistan.

On 18 April 1945, he married Italian writer Alba de Céspedes y Bertini. From a letter written by De Céspedes in 1958, it can be evinced that the two had decided to split, due to her inability, due to her professional career, to follow Bounous around the world. Eventually, however, the two stayed together until Bounous' death in 1987.

Bounous was made a Grand Officer of the Order of Merit of the Italian Republic by the Italian State on 27 December 1966.

He died on 27 April 1987.

== See also ==
- Ministry of Foreign Affairs (Italy)
- Foreign relations of Italy
