= Antonio Armellini =

Italian diplomat

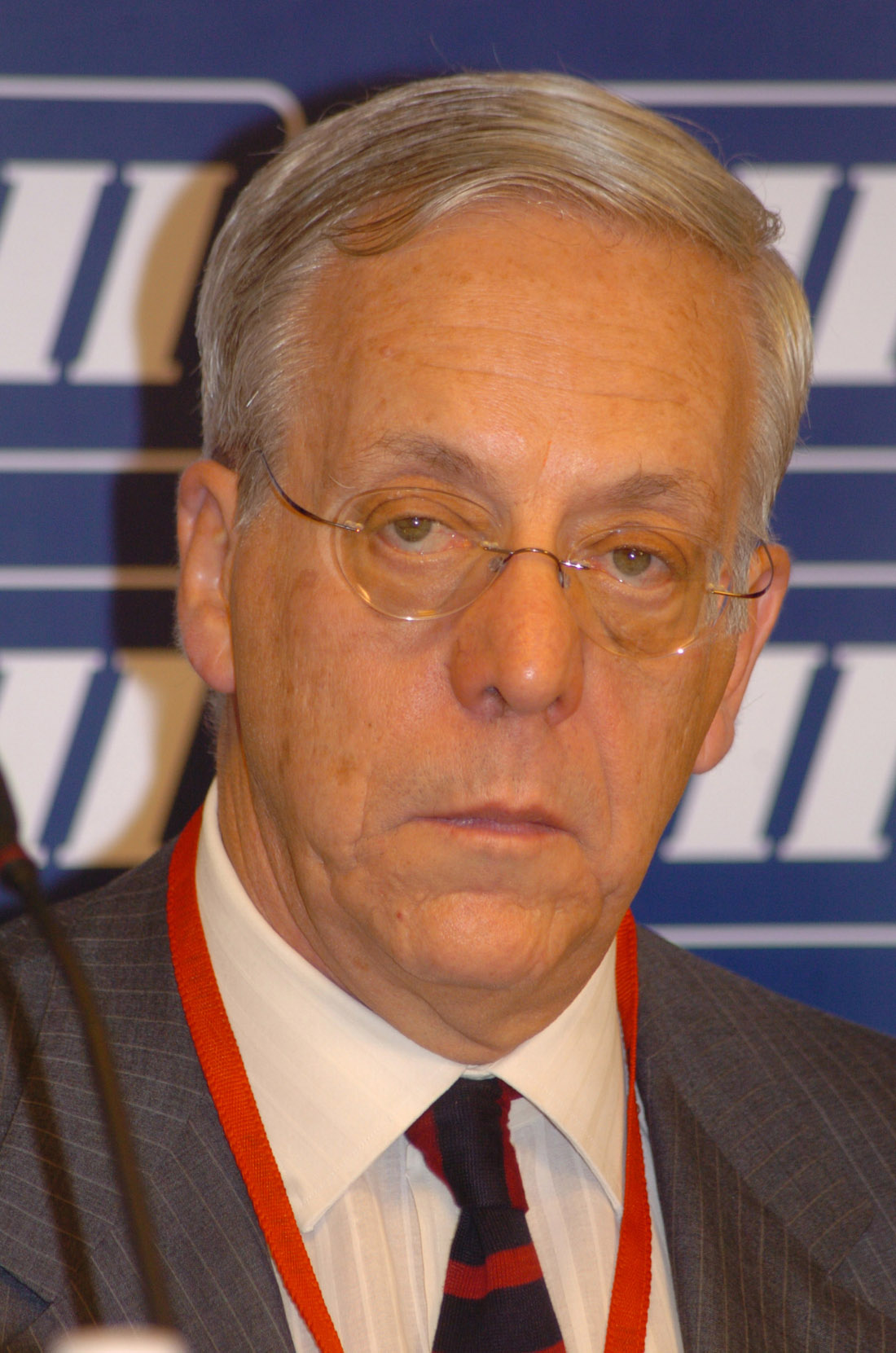
- Portrait of Antonio Armellini

Ambassador of Italy to Algeria
- In office 1998–2000
- Preceded by: Francesco de Courten
- Succeeded by: Romualdo Bettini

Ambassador of Italy to India
- In office 2004–2008
- Preceded by: Benedetto Amari
- Succeeded by: Roberto Toscano

Permanent Representative of Italy to the OECD
- In office 2008–2010
- Preceded by: Bruno Cabras
- Succeeded by: Carlo Maria Oliva

Personal details
- Born: August 2, 1943 (age 83) Rome
- Education: In 1967 he obtained a degree in laws from the University of Rome, From 1962 to 1963 got a Fulbright and ASSV Scholar at Stanford University.
- Profession: diplomat

Antonio Armellini (August 2, 1943) is an Italian diplomat who served as ambassador to Algeria, India and to the OECD.

== Career ==
He served in many Government of Italy offices during the early 70s, including the private office of Foreign Minister and subsequently Prime Minister of Italy Aldo Moro.

He was spokesman for EC Commissioner Altiero Spinelli in Brussels from 1972 to 1974. During the 1980s and 1990s he served in many foreign diplomatic postings, including Warsaw, Addis Ababa and London.

He was roving ambassador to the CSCE (Conference on Security and Cooperation in Europe) from 1990 to 1992. He subsequently became ambassador to Algeria from 1998 to 2000. He was ambassador at large in charge of international terrorism in 2002 and was appointed Head of the Italian mission and special envoy to Iraq in 2003.

He was ambassador to India from 2004 to 2008 and Permanent Representative to the OECD in Paris from 2008 to 2010.

He has published several books in International Affairs.

== Family ==
He is married and has two children.

== Works ==
- Armellini, Antonio - Trichilo, Paolo. Il terrorismo internazionale dopo l'11 settembre: l'azione dell'Italia, IAI Quaderni, Milano, 2003.
- Armellini, Antonio. L’elefante ha messo le ali. L’India del XXI secolo, Egea, Milano, 2008.
- Armellini, Antonio. If the elephant flies : India confronts the twenty-first century, Har-anand, New Delhi, 2012.
- Armellini, Antonio - Mombelli, Gerardo. Né centauro né chimera. Modesta proposta per un'Europa plurale, Marsilio, Venezia, 2017.
- Armellini, Antonio (2022). L'Italia e la Carta di Parigi della CSCE per una nuova Europa. Storia di un negoziato (luglio-novembre 1990) (PDF). Napoli: Editoriale Scientifica. ISBN 979-12-5976-315-0.

== Honors ==
Order of Merit of the Italian Republic 1st Class / Knight Grand Cross – February 9, 2010
