= Federico Baistrocchi =

Italian general

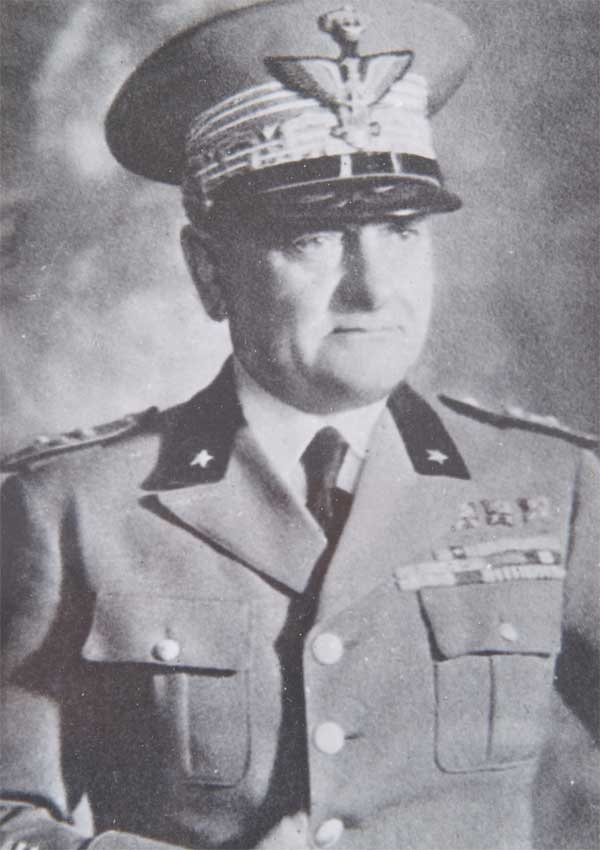

Chief of Staff of the Royal Italian Army
- In office 1 October 1934 – 7 October 1936
- Preceded by: Alberto Bonzani
- Succeeded by: Alberto Pariani

Personal details
- Born: 9 June 1871 Naples, Kingdom of Italy
- Died: 31 May 1947 (aged 75) Rome, Italy
- Awards: Silver Medal of Military Valor (three times); War Merit Cross (twice); Military Order of Savoy; Order of the Crown of Italy; Order of Saints Maurice and Lazarus; Colonial Order of the Star of Italy; Maurician Medal; Legion of Honour; Order of St. Gregory the Great

Military service
- Allegiance: Kingdom of Italy
- Branch/service: Royal Italian Army
- Rank: Army General
- Commands: Naples Fortress Area; Verona Army Corps; Army Chief of Staff
- Battles/wars: First Italo-Ethiopian War; Italo-Turkish War; World War I; Albanian campaign; Battle of Asiago; Battles of the Isonzo; Battle of Caporetto; Battle of Vittorio Veneto; Second Italo-Ethiopian War; World War II

Federico Baistrocchi (9 June 1871 – 31 May 1947) was an Italian general during the interwar period and World War II. He served as State Undersecretary for War from 1933 to 1936 and as Chief of Staff of the Royal Italian Army from 1934 to 1936. He was also a member of the Chamber of Deputies (from 1924 to 1939) and of the Senate (from 1939 to 1943) of the Kingdom of Italy.

== Biography ==
=== Early life and career ===
He was born in Naples from Achille Baistrocchi, General of the Bersaglieri, and Elvira Santamaria Nicolini, a descendant of a well-known family of local lawyers. He studied at the Nunziatella Military School of Naples and subsequently entered the Royal Military Academy of Artillery and Engineers of Turin, graduating in 1889 with the rank of artillery second lieutenant. In 1896 he fought in the last phase of the First Italo-Abyssinian War, and in 1912 he participated in the Italo-Turkish War, where he was promoted to major and awarded the Knight's Cross of the Military Order of Savoy for war merits. In 1900 he had a son, Umberto.

=== World War I ===
During the First World War Baistrocchi initially served in Albania at the command of an artillery groupment; having returned to Italy with the rank of lieutenant colonel, he fought on the Dolomites front and later in Vallarsa and on the Pasubio, where he tasked the mathematician Mauro Picone with drawing up new firing tables for heavy artillery deployed on the Alpine front. He was subsequently transferred to the Isonzo front; during the retreat that followed the battle of Caporetto his artillerymen managed to carry their guns from the Banjšice Plateau to the Tagliamento river, where they were forced to abandon them as the bridges had been blown up. During the battle of Vittorio Veneto, with the rank of Brigadier General, Baistrocchi was commander of the artillery of the 7th Army in the Giudicarie. During the war he distinguished himself for his effectiveness in supporting the infantry with his artillery, and was awarded three Silver Medals for Military Valor; after the Eleventh Battle of the Isonzo, the Arditi of the 1st Assault Battalion offered him a gold medal as a sign of gratitude for the help of his artillery in the capture of the Banjšice Plateau.

After the end of the war he was sent to Libya, where he remained until late 1919.

=== Fascist regime ===
In October 1922, at the time of the march on Rome, Baistrocchi was in command of the Naples Fortress Area, and assured Mussolini that he would not intervene against him during the fascist rally in the Campanian capital. In 1924, having joined the National Fascist Party, he was elected to the Chamber of Deputies in the XXVII legislature, being later re-elected in 1929 in the XXVIII legislature and in 1934 in the XXIX. In 1926 he was promoted to major general and in 1931 to lieutenant general, assuming command of the Army Corps of Verona.

In July 1933 Mussolini assumed the post of Minister of War and appointed Baistrocchi to the position Undersecretary of State for War, with the task of starting a "program of modernization of the Armed Forces" which would included the establishment of pre-military and post-military education, modernization and mechanization of the armed forces, the creation of motorized divisions, and the modernization of artillery and individual weapons. This program was only partially implemented, but under Baistrocchi bersaglieri, artillery and cavalry units were motorized and the Automobile Corps and the Guardia alla Frontiera were created. On November 14, 1933, he issued the so-called "Baistrocchi Reform", on uniforms, ranks and equipment of the Royal Italian Army, the Volunteer Militia for National Security and the Carabinieri. On 1 October 1934 Baistrocchi was also appointed Chief of Staff of the Royal Italian Army. During the Second Italo-Ethiopian War he favored the establishment of blackshirt divisions, under the command of army officers, and organized the transfer to East Africa of twenty fully-equipped divisions (as opposed to four that had been originally planned to be sent); appreciating his capabilities, Mussolini considered replacing Marshal of Italy Pietro Badoglio, in charge of the operations in Ethiopia, with him, but Baistrocchi declined the offer, stating that a change of command during the campaign would have had a negative effect on the conduct of the war, and that it would have been more useful for him to stay in Rome and supervise the preparation and sending of reinforcements and supplies to East Africa. Mussolini's proposal, however, caused a rift between Baistrocchi and Badoglio, who thought that the former had tried to usurp his post and swore to make him pay for it, as he declared to Rodolfo Graziani in a private conversation.

On 23 May 1936, shortly after the proclamation of the Italian Empire in East Africa, Baistrocchi was promoted to the rank of Army General. After the conquest of Ethiopia was completed, the repatriation of most Italian units that had participated in the campaign began, but Baistrocchi opposed it, foreseeing a war with the British Empire in the near future and stressing the need for Italian East Africa to be well-garrisoned and autonomous from Italy, as it would not be possible to send supplies and reinforcements after the war had broken out. In a letter written to Mussolini on 18 September 1936, Baistrocchi warned "The war that you foresee will be long... it will find the universe divided into two camps engaged in a merciless struggle and therefore it will be extremely long and to the last man. The one who will triumph will be the one who will have better prepared, resisted, supplied himself. The Mediterranean is not ours; England rules it (...) France and also America (as I think that it will be against us as well) will want to make us pay for our great success in Africa". He further added that the repatriation of troops and equipment used for the conquest of Ethiopia would entail the loss of Italian East Africa in the event of such a war. Mussolini received the letter negatively, and Badoglio took advantage of this to persuade the Duce to dismiss Baistrocchi; on 7 October 1936 the general was thus replaced by Alberto Pariani as both State Undersecretary of State for war and Chief of Staff of the Army. This marked the end of Baistrocchi's military career, although on 7 October 1937 he was granted the title of Count by Royal Decree and on 25 March 1939 he was appointed Senator of the Kingdom of Italy.

Baistrocchi was later heavily criticized by other generals for "having introduced the Fascist mindset and methods" into the Royal Italian Army, giving in to meddling by Fascist Party leaders in the promotion system, allowing careerism to run rampant and prioritizing pomp over substance; among others, Generals Giacomo Zanussi and Quirino Armellini accused him of this in their postwar memoirs, with Pietro Badoglio (who however was a personal enemy of him) describing Baistrocchi as "nefarious" and Marshal of Italy Giovanni Messe calling him a "madman" while talking with other prisoners during his captivity in Great Britain, and stating that he and Pariani had brought the country to ruin. According to Giuseppe Bottai, even King Victor Emmanuel III stated that Baistrocchi and Pariani had "ruined the Army". During Baistrocchi's tenure, the Fascist salute and the goose step were introduced in the Army, portraits of Mussolini and Fascist slogans were placed in all barracks, and membership in the National Fascist Party was made mandatory to enter military academies.

In 1944 Baistrocchi was transferred to the Army reserve for having reached age limits. On 18 April 1945 he was arrested by order of the Commissariat for Sanctions against Fascism and imprisoned in the Regina Coeli prison in Rome; held together with common criminals, he lost over twenty kilograms during his imprisonment. After one year and three months in Regina Coeli, he was transferred to the military prison of Fort Boccea, where he was held for a further two months while awaiting trial by the military tribunal of Rome on charges of having fascistized the Royal Italian Army. The trial took place in September 1946; it lasted twelve days and resulted in his acquittal and release. Weakened by his imprisonment, Baistrocchi suffered a heart attack and died on 31 May 1947; he was buried in Bologna.
