= Viceroy =

Representative of a monarch

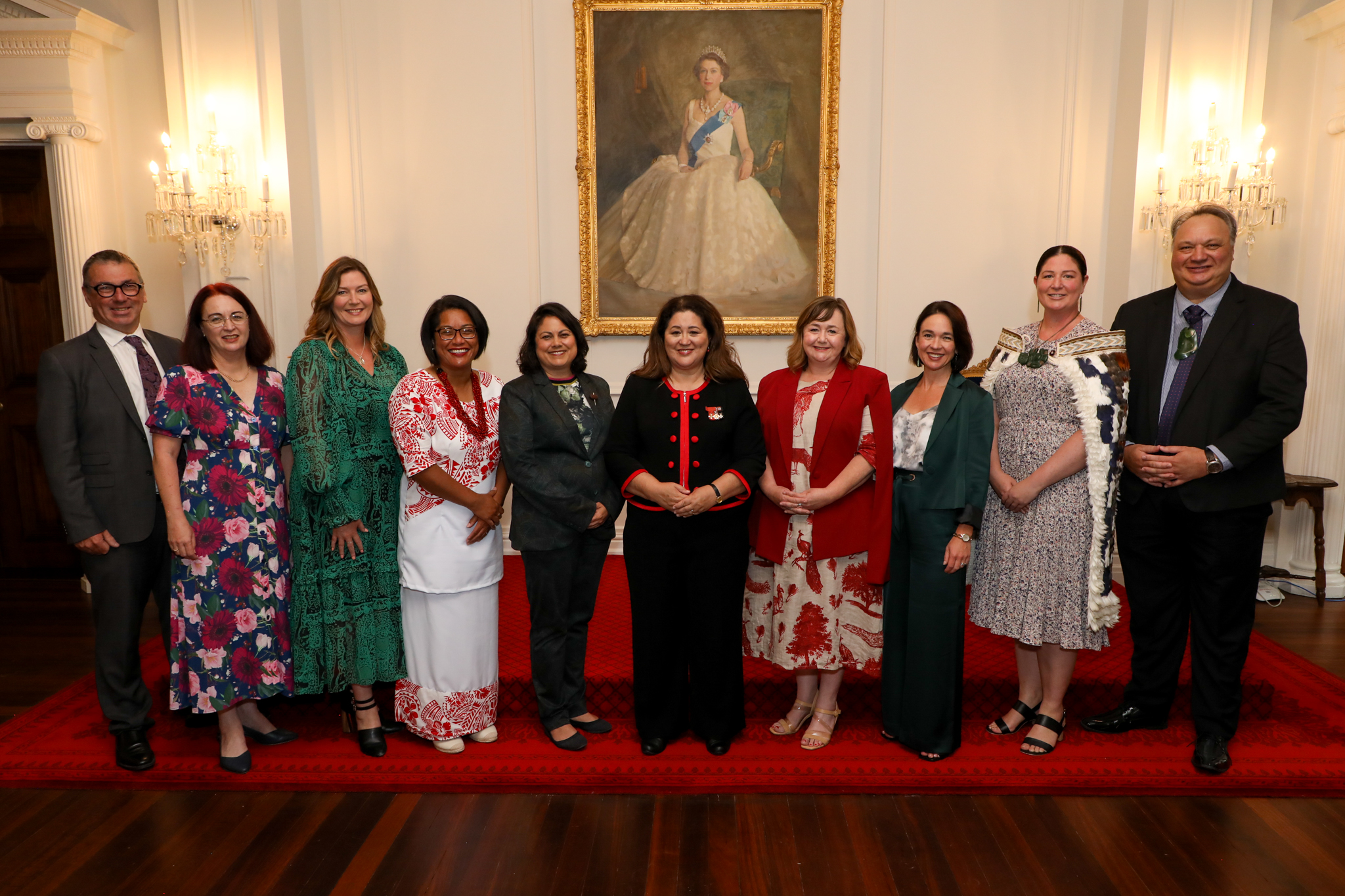
Cindy Kiro (centre), the governor-general of New Zealand, with Executive Council members in 2023, in front of the portrait of Elizabeth II, Queen of New Zealand.

A viceroy (/ˈvaɪs.rɔɪ/) is an official who reigns over a polity in the name of and as the representative of the monarch of the territory.

The term derives from the Latin prefix vice-, meaning "in place of" and the Anglo-Norman roy (Old French roi, roy), meaning "king". This denotes the position as one who acts on behalf of a king or monarch ("in place of king"). A viceroy's territory may be called a viceroyalty, though this term is not always applied. The adjectival form is viceregal, less often viceroyal. The term vicereine is sometimes used to indicate a female viceroy suo jure, although viceroy can serve as a gender-neutral term. Vicereine is more commonly used to indicate a viceroy's wife, known as the viceregal consort.

The term has occasionally been applied to the governors-general of the Commonwealth realms, who are viceregal representatives of the monarch.

The position of a viceroy is by royal appointment rather than a noble rank. An individual viceroy often also held a separate noble title, such as Bernardo de Gálvez, 1st Viscount of Galveston, who was also Viceroy of New Spain.

== Spanish Empire ==
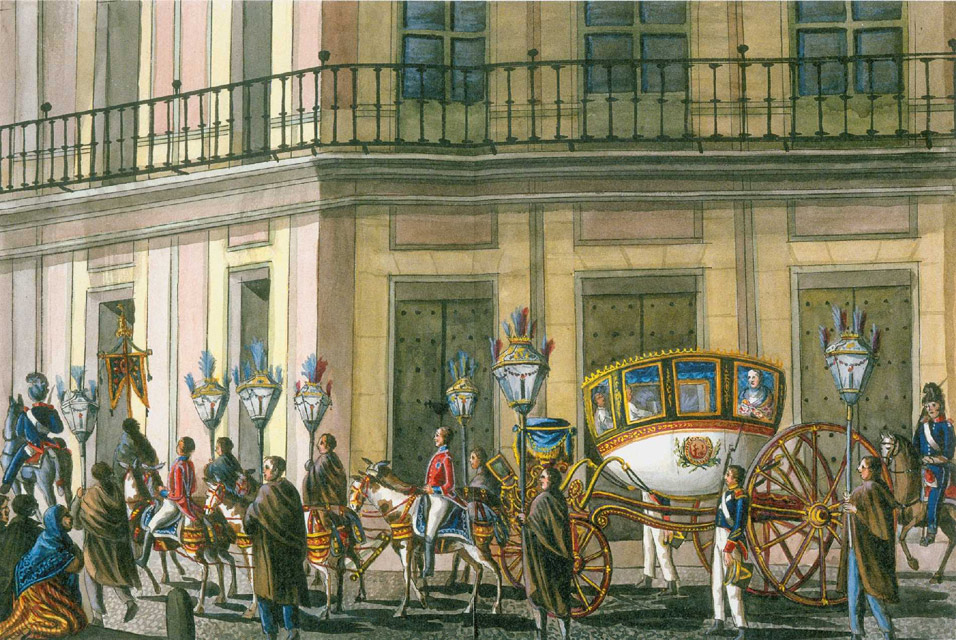
A watercolor of a procession in Mexico City of the Viceroy of New Spain, ca. 1821

The title was originally used only in Catalonia by the House of Barcelona, and was applied later to the Crown of Aragon, referring at the beginning of the 14th century to the governors of Sardinia and Corsica. At the end of the 15th century, Christopher Columbus explicitly required to the kings of Spain to be appointed viceroy of the lands he might discover, this being formulated in the Capitulations. Later in the 16th Century numerous viceroys ruled over various parts of the increasingly vast Spanish Empire, which reached Europe, the Americas, and overseas elsewhere.

=== In Spanish ruled Europe ===
In Europe, until the 18th century, the Habsburg crown appointed viceroys of Catalonia, Aragon, Valencia, Navarre, Portugal during the brief period known as the Iberian Union, Sardinia, Sicily, and Naples. With the ascension of the House of Bourbon to the Spanish throne, the historic Aragonese viceroyalties were replaced by new captaincies general. At the end of War of the Spanish Succession, the Spanish monarchy was shorn of its Italian possessions. These Italian territories, however, continued to have viceroys under their new rulers for some time; Naples until 1734, Sicily until 1816 and Sardinia until 1848.

See also:

- List of viceroys of Aragon
- List of viceroys of Valencia
- List of viceroys of Catalonia
- List of viceroys of Navarre
- List of viceroys of Sardinia
- List of viceroys of Sicily
- List of viceroys of Naples

=== In the Americas ===
Much of the Americas were incorporated into the Crown of Castile. With the Spanish colonization of the Americas, the institution of viceroys was adapted to govern the highly populated and wealthy regions of the north overseas: New Spain (Mexico) and the south overseas: Peru and South America. The viceroys of these two areas had oversight of the other provinces, with most North American, Central American, Caribbean and East Indies areas supervised by the viceroy in Mexico City and the South American areas by the viceroy in Lima, (excepting most of today's Venezuela, which was overseen by the high court, or Audiencia of Santo Domingo on the island of Hispaniola for most of the colonial period). These large administrative territories became known as viceroyalties (Spanish term: virreinatos). There were only two New World viceroyalties until the 18th century, when the new Bourbon dynasty established two additional viceroyalties to promote economic growth and new settlements on South America. New viceroyalties were created for New Granada in 1717 (capital, Bogotá) and the Río de la Plata in 1776 (capital, Buenos Aires).

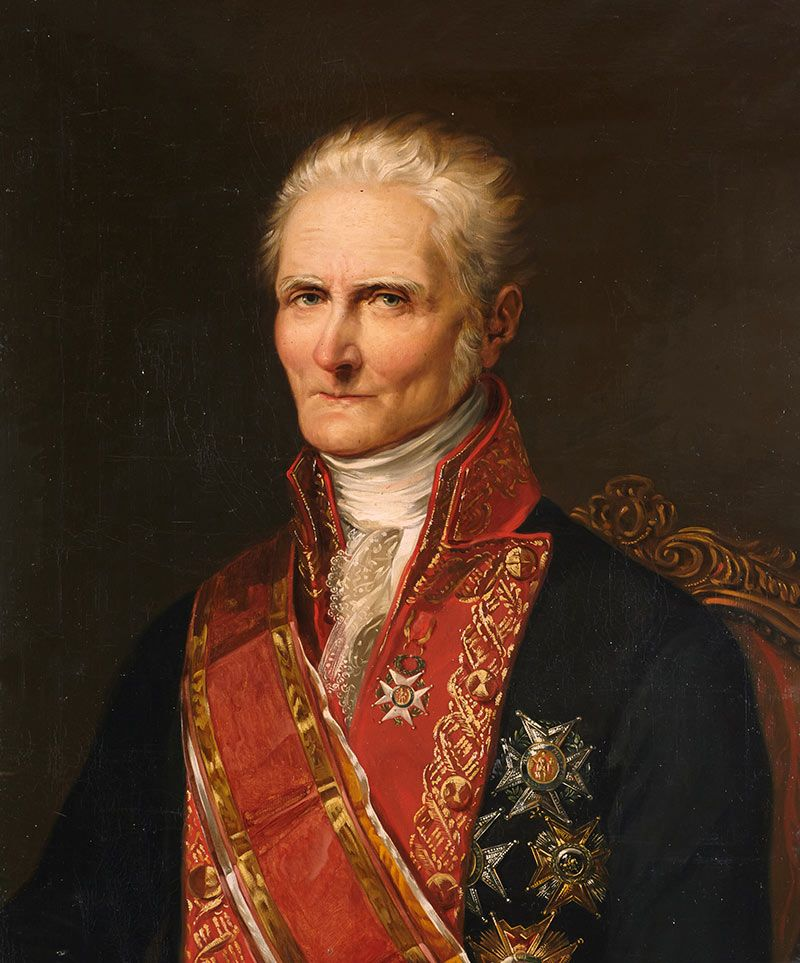
Joaquín de la Pezuela, penultimate viceroy of Peru

The viceroyalties of the Spanish Americas and the Spanish East Indies were subdivided into smaller, autonomous units, the audiencias (tribunal with the authority to judge), and the captaincies general (military districts), which in most cases became the bases for the independent countries of modern Hispanic America. These units gathered the local provinces which could be governed by either a crown official, a corregidor (sometimes alcalde mayor) or by a cabildo or town council. Audiencias primarily functioned as superior judicial tribunals, but unlike their European counterparts, the New World audiencias were granted by law, both administrative and legislative powers. Captaincies general were primarily military districts set up in areas with a risk of foreign or Indian attack, although the captains general were usually given political powers over the provinces under their command. Because the long distances to the viceregal capital would hamper effective communication, both audiencias and captains general were authorized to communicate directly with the crown through the Council of the Indies. The Bourbon Reforms introduced the new office of the intendant, which was appointed directly by the crown and had broad fiscal and administrative powers in political and military issues.

The most important institution of the Spanish administration in the Indies was the viceroyalty. Although it was not an institution in itself—the principal administrative body being the Royal Audiencia—it concentrated most of the royal authority. The viceroy was the king's alter ego, enjoying extensive civil and ecclesiastical privileges until the reforms of Charles III, which reduced the powers of the viceroys by creating the office of Regent of the Royal Audiencia, who thereafter presided over the Audiencia.

Viceroyalty	1492–1536	1535–1717	1717–1723	1723–1739	1739–1824
Viceroyalty	Viceroyalty of the Indies, Islands and Tierra Firme (1492–1536)	Viceroyalty of New Spain (1535–1821)			
Viceroyalty	Viceroyalty of the Indies, Islands and Tierra Firme (1492–1536)	Viceroyalty of Peru (1542–)	Viceroyalty of New Granada (1717–1723)	Viceroyalty of Peru (Continued)	Viceroyalty of New Granada (1739–1812; 1816–1822)
Viceroyalty	Viceroyalty of the Indies, Islands and Tierra Firme (1492–1536)	Viceroyalty of Peru (1542–)	Viceroyalty of Peru (Continued)	Viceroyalty of Peru (Continued)	Viceroyalty of Peru (–1824)
Viceroyalty	Viceroyalty of the Indies, Islands and Tierra Firme (1492–1536)	Viceroyalty of Peru (1542–)	Viceroyalty of Peru (Continued)	Viceroyalty of Peru (Continued)	Viceroyalty of the Río de la Plata (1776–1811)

See also:

- Viceroyalty of the Indies (later called the West Indies) (1492–1535)
- Viceroyalty of New Spain (1535–1821) – List of viceroys of New Spain
- Viceroyalty of Peru (1542–1824) – List of viceroys of Peru
- Viceroyalty of New Granada (1717–1819) – List of viceroys of New Granada
- Viceroyalty of the Río de la Plata (1776–1814) – List of viceroys of the Río de la Plata

== Portuguese Empire ==
=== India ===
From 1505 to 1896 Portuguese India – including, until 1752, all Portuguese possessions in the Indian Ocean, from southern Africa to Southeast Asia and Australasia – was governed alternatively by either a viceroy (Portuguese vice-rei) or governor and commission located in the capital of Goa. The government started seven years after the discovery of sea route to India by Vasco da Gama, in 1505, under the first viceroy, Francisco de Almeida (b.1450–d.1510). Initially, King Manuel I of Portugal tried to distribute power with three governors in different areas of jurisdiction: a government covering the area and possessions in East Africa, Arabian Peninsula and Persian Gulf, overseeing up to Cambay (Gujarat); a second one ruling the possessions in India (Hindustan) and Ceylon; and a third one from Malacca to the Far East. However, Governor Afonso de Albuquerque (1509–1515) centralized the post into a plenipotentiary office, which it remained after his tenure. The typical duration in office was usually three years, although powerful viceroys might extend their tenure; of the thirty-four governors of India in the 16th century, only six had longer mandates.

- List of governors of Portuguese India (1505–1961)

=== Portugal ===
During some periods of the Iberian Union, between 1580 and 1640, the king of Spain, who was also king of Portugal, appointed viceroys to govern Portugal itself, as the king had multiple realms throughout Europe and delegated his powers to various viceroys.

=== Brazil ===
After the end of the Iberian Union in 1640, the governors of Brazil that were members of the Portuguese high nobility started to use the title of Viceroy. Brazil became a permanent Viceroyalty in 1763, when the capital of the State of Brazil (Estado do Brasil) was transferred from Salvador to Rio de Janeiro.

== British Empire ==
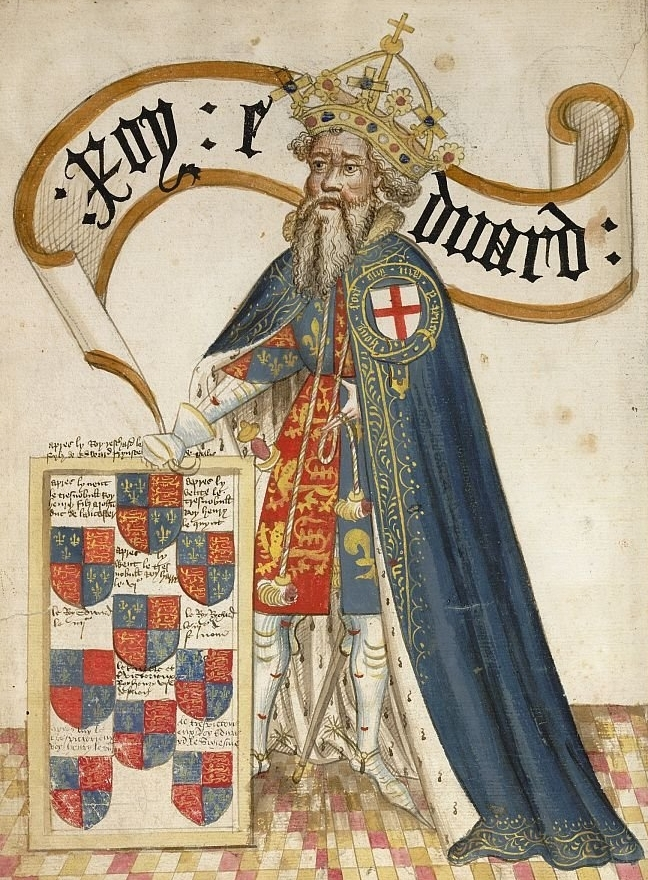
"Roy" Edward III, King of England. Bruges Garter Book.

=== India ===
Following adoption of the Government of India Act 1858, which transferred control of India from the East India Company to the British Crown, the Governor-General as representing the Crown became known as the Viceroy. The designation Viceroy, although it was most frequently used in ordinary parlance, had no statutory authority, and was never employed by Parliament. Although the Proclamation of 1858 announcing the assumption of the government of India by the Crown referred to Lord Canning as "first viceroy and governor-general", none of the warrants appointing his successors referred to them as viceroys, and the title, which was frequently used in warrants dealing with precedence and in public notifications, was basically one of ceremony used in connection with the state and social functions of the sovereign's representative. The governor-general continued to be the sole representative of the Crown, and the government of India continued to be vested in the Governor-General-in-Council.

The viceroys reported directly to the secretary of state for India in London and were advised by the Council of India. They were largely unencumbered in the exercise of their authority and were among the most powerful men on earth in the Victorian and Edwardian eras, ruling over an entire subcontinent with a large military force at their disposal in the form of the Indian Army. Under the terms of the Government of India Act 1919, viceroys shared some limited aspects of their authority with the Central Legislative Assembly, one of the first steps in the establishment of Indian home rule. This process was accelerated by the Government of India Act 1935 and ultimately led to the independence of India and Pakistan as dominions in 1947. Both countries finally severed complete ties with Britain when they became republics – India as a secular republic in 1950 and Pakistan as an Islamic republic in 1956.

Alongside the Commander-in-Chief, India, the viceroy was the public face of the British presence in India, attending to many ceremonial functions as well as political affairs. As the representative of the emperors and empress of India, who were also the kings and queens of the United Kingdom of Great Britain and Ireland, the viceroy served as the grand master of the two principal orders of chivalry of British India: the Order of the Star of India and the Order of the Indian Empire. During the office's history, the governors-general of India were based in two cities: Calcutta until 1911 and New Delhi afterwards. Additionally, whilst Calcutta was the capital of India, the viceroys spent the summer months at Simla. The two historic residences of the viceroys still stand: the Viceroy's House in New Delhi and Government House in Kolkata. They are used today as the official residences of the president of India and the governor of West Bengal, respectively. The portraits of the governors-general still hang in a room on the ground floor of the Presidential Palace, one of the last vestiges of both the viceroys and the British Raj.

Notable governors-general of India include Warren Hastings, Lord Cornwallis, Lord Curzon, The Earl of Minto, Lord Chelmsford, and Lord Mountbatten. Lord Mountbatten served as the last Viceroy of India, but continued on as the first governor-general of the Dominion of India.

=== Ireland ===
The lords lieutenant of Ireland were often referred to as viceroy after 1700 until 1922, even though the Kingdom of Ireland had been merged in 1801 into the United Kingdom of Great Britain and Ireland.

== Commonwealth realms ==
The term has occasionally been applied to the governors-general of the Commonwealth realms, for example Gough Whitlam in 1973 told the Australian House of Representatives: "The Governor-General is the viceroy of the Queen of Australia".

The Australia Act 1986 also provide that all royal powers in Australia, except the actual appointment of the governor-general and the governors, are exercisable by the viceregal representatives. The noun viceroy is rarely used, but the adjective viceregal is standard usage.

== Russian Empire ==
Namestnik (Russian: наме́стник, Russian pronunciation: [nɐˈmʲesʲnʲɪk]) was an official position in the history of the Russian Empire. It can be translated as "viceroy", "deputy", "lieutenant" (in the broadest sense of the word) or in place appointee. The term has two periods of usage, with different meanings.

- In the 8th–16th centuries, namestniks (more correctly knyaz namestniks, or "knyaz deputies") were in charge of local administration. In particular, they ruled uyezds.
- In the 18th–20th centuries, a namestnik was a person in charge of namestnichestvo, with plenipotentiary powers. The latter has traditionally been translated as "viceroyalty" and namestnik as "viceroy" or "vicegerent" (or, as a common blunder, "viceregent"). For example, Mikhail Vorontsov was namestnik of Bessarabia (1823–44) and of the Caucasus (1844–1854). Sometimes the term is confused with governor general (генерал-губернатор). For example, during Vorontsov's term of office in Bessarabia, seven governor-generals were in, and at the same time he held the office of governor general of Novorossiya. The following namestniks existed under the House of Romanov emperors of Russia:
  - Congress Kingdom of Poland, while under the emperors of Russia as kings (styled tsar; 20 June 1815 – 5 November 1916), had a viceroy styled Namiestnik of Poland not to be confused with the military governor. The most famous governor (but not namiestnik) was (9 December 1815 – 1 December 1830) Grand Duke Konstantin Pavlovich Romanov (1779–1831) (Not to be confused with his nephew Grand Duke Konstantin Nikolayevich of Russia, Viceroy of Poland 1862-1863)
  - Viceroyalty of the Caucasus – Transcaucasia (Armenia, Azerbaijan and Georgia; first under governors in Tbilisi 1802–1844) had viceroys of Transcaucasia.
  - Viceroyalty of the Far East, lasted from July 30, 1903, to June 8, 1905, with Yevgeni Ivanovich Alekseyev being the sole office holder.

The Tsar Paul I's 1799 formation of the Russian-American Company obviated viceroys in the colonization of the northwestern New World.

== Other viceroyalties ==
=== French colonies ===
New France, in present Canada, had a single governor:

- Jacques Cartier: 24 July 1534 – 15 January 1541

Thereafter it had lieutenants-general and viceroys:

- Jean François de la Rocquet, sieur de Roberval (c. 1500 – 1560): 15 January 1541 – September 1543)
- interregnum September 1543 – 3 January 1578
- Troilus de Mesgouez, marquis de la Roche-Mesgouez (died February 1606): viceroy from 3 January 1578, lieutenant-general from 12 January 1598
- Jean de Biencourt, sieur de Poutrincourt, baron de St. Just (1557–1615): February 1606 – 1614

Next were a series of viceroys (resident in France) from 8 October 1611 to 1672. Later there were governors and governors-general.

The president of France retains, ex officio, the title of Co-Prince in the neighboring microstate of Andorra (a post previously occupied by the king of France) and continues to send a personal representative, a de facto viceroy to rule on their behalf (as does their co-ruler, the Bishop of Urgell).

The French position of "adjunct département director, delegate for the sea and coast of the Atlantic Pyrenees and Landes" carries the title of "viceroy of Pheasant Island". Pheasant Island is a French-Spanish condominium on the river Bidasoa.

=== Italian colonies ===
In Italian viceré: The highest colonial representatives in the "federation" of Italian East Africa (six provinces, each under a governor; together Ethiopia, Eritrea and Somaliland) were no longer styled high commissioner, but viceroy and governor-general from 5 May 1936, when Italian forces occupied the Ethiopian Empire (today Ethiopia), until 27 November 1941, when the last Italian administrator surrendered to the Allies.

On 7 April 1939, Italy invaded the Albanian Kingdom (today Albania). As viceré of Albania of Victor Emmanuel III of Italy were the Marchese Francesco Jacomoni di San Savino and after his departure General Alberto Pariani.

=== Ban of Bosnia ===
Ban Borić was the first ruler and viceroy of Bosnia, appointed by Géza II of Hungary by 1154. His war affairs are documented as he fought several notable battles. He also maintained ties with knights Templar and donated lands in Bosnia and Slavonia to their order. His own biological brother Dominic was on record as a Knight Templar.

Due to his vast powers over Bosnian politics and essential veto powers, the modern-day position of the high representative for Bosnia and Herzegovina has been compared to that of a viceroy.

=== Ban of Croatia ===
From the earliest medieval period in the Kingdom of Croatia, the position of viceroy was held by Ban of Croatia who acted as king's representative in Croatian lands and supreme commander of Croatian army. In the 18th century, Croatian bans eventually become chief government officials in Croatia. They were at the head of Ban's Government, effectively the first prime ministers of Croatia. The last ban held his position until 1941 and the collapse of Yugoslavia in World War II.

== Ancient antecedents ==
An equivalent office, called the Exarch, was created in the Byzantine or Eastern Roman Empire towards the end of the sixth century for governors of important areas too far from the imperial capital of Constantinople to receive regular instruction or reinforcement. The chosen governors of these provinces were empowered to act in place of the monarch (hence ex- "outside", arch "ruler") with more discretion and autonomy than was granted other categories of governor. This was an extraordinary break from the centralized traditions of the Roman Empire and was an early example of the principle of viceroyalty.

== Non-Western counterparts ==
As with many princely and administrative titles, viceroy is often used, generally unofficially, to render somewhat equivalent titles and offices in non-western cultures.

=== Africa ===
In cultures all over the continent of Africa, the role of viceroy has been subsumed into a hereditary noble as opposed to strictly administrative position. In the Arabo-Berber north, for example, the title of Khalifa is often used by individuals who derive their authority to rule from someone else in much the same way as a viceroy would. Elsewhere, subordinate inkosis under the rule of a paramount chief like the King of the Zulu Nation of Southern Africa or subordinate baales in the realms of the reigning obas of West African Yorubaland continue to occupy statutorily recognized positions in the contemporary countries of South Africa and Nigeria as the customary representatives of their respective principals in the various areas that are under their immediate control.

=== Indian empires ===
==== Magadha Empire ====
The viceroy in the Magadha Empire was called Uparaja (lit. vice king).

==== Mughal Empire ====
The Mughal Empire had a system of administration which involved both official governors appointed from the capital, and local feudal lords (zamindars). Subahdars were the former, and can be seen as equivalents of viceroys, governing the provinces (subahs) by appointment from the capital. Mansabdars were military governors who were also appointed to provincial government, but they were appointed for military rather than civilian government.

=== Ottoman Empire ===
The Khedive of Egypt, especially during the reign of Muhammad Ali Pasha (1805–1848). This officer established an almost autonomous regime in Egypt, which officially still was under Ottoman rule. Although Mehemet Ali/Muhammad Ali used different symbols to mark his independence from the Sublime Porte, he never openly declared himself independent. Adopting the title of viceroy was yet another way to walk the thin line between challenging the Sultan's power explicitly and respecting his jurisdiction. Muhammad Ali Pasha's grandson, Ismail Pasha, subsequently received the title of Khedive which was almost an equivalent to viceroy.

Other titles, such as Sharif (as in the Sharifate of Mecca), or Khan (as in the Crimean Khanate or the Khanate of Kazan), denoted hereditary rulers of Ottoman vassal states, under the Sultan's titles of Caliph and Great Khan, respectively.

Titles such as pasha, beylerbey, bey, and agha denote officials who were, at least nominally, appointed to their positions by the Sublime Porte rather than hereditary privilege. Pashas and beylerbeys were appointed to govern provinces called eyalets, until the promulgation of the Vilayet Law in 1867 ended the eyalet system, replacing it with more centrally-controlled vilayets. The beylerbey of the Rumelia Eyalet was the only provincial governor entitled to a seat in the Imperial Council, but only when a matter fell within his jurisdiction.

=== Vietnamese Empire ===
The post of Tổng Trấn (governor of all military provinces) was a political post in the early period of the Vietnamese Nguyễn dynasty (1802–1830). From 1802, under the reign of emperor Gia Long, there were two Tổng Trấn who administered Vietnam's northern part named Bắc thành with administrative center in Hanoi and the southern part Gia Định thành with administrative center in Gia Định, while Nguyen emperors ruled only the central region Kinh Kỳ from capital Phú Xuân. Tổng Trấn is sometimes translated to English as viceroy. In 1830, emperor Minh Mạng abolished the post in order to increase the imperial direct ruling power in all over Vietnam.

=== Chinese empires ===
During the Han, Ming and Qing dynasties, there existed positions of viceroys having control over various provinces (e.g., Liangguang = Guangdong and Guangxi, Huguang = Hubei and Hunan).

=== Siam ===
In Siam before 1885, the title was used for the heir-apparent or heir presumptive (Thai: กรมพระราชวังบวรสถานมงคล). The title was abolished and replaced with that of the Crown Prince of Siam.

== See also ==
- Governor
- Governor-General
- Proconsul
- Regent
- Vicegerent
- Naib

== Bibliography ==
- Aznar, Daniel/Hanotin, Guillaume/May, Niels F. (dir.), À la place du roi. Vice-rois, gouverneurs et ambassadeurs dans les monarchies française et espagnole (XVIe-XVIIIe siècles). Madrid: Casa de Velázquez, 2014.
- Elliott, J. H., Imperial Spain, 1469–1716. London: Edward Arnold, 1963.
- Fisher, Lillian Estelle. Viceregal Administration in the Spanish American Colonies. Berkeley, University of California Press, 1926.
- Harding, C. H., The Spanish Empire in America. New York: Oxford University Press, 1947.
