= List of ambassadors of Italy to Thailand =

Coordinates: 13.739326°N 100.547845°E

Ambassador of Italy to Thailand
- Emblem of Italy
- Style: His Excellency
- Inaugural holder: Guelfo Zamboni
- Formation: 1956

The Italian ambassador in Bangkok is the official representative of the Government in Rome to the Government of Thailand.

Since 1870 the governments in Rome and Bangkok maintain diplomatic relations.

== List of representatives ==
Diplomatic accreditation	Ambassador	Observations	List of prime ministers of Italy	List of prime ministers of Thailand	term end
1956	Guelfo Zamboni		Antonio Segni	Phibul Songkhram	1959
1959	Ezio Mizzan		Antonio Segni	Sarit Dhanarajata	1965
1965	Andrea Ferrero		Giovanni Leone	Thanom Kittikachorn	1969
1969	Eugenio Rubino		Giovanni Leone	Thanom Kittikachorn	1972
1972	Diego Soro		Giulio Andreotti	Thanom Kittikachorn	1974
1974	Mario Prunas		Aldo Moro	Sanya Dharmasakti	1978
1978	Francesco Ripandelli		Giulio Andreotti	Kriangsak Chomanan	1984
1984	Francesco Guariglia		Bettino Craxi	Prem Tinsulanonda	1986
1986	Maurizio Battaglini		Bettino Craxi	Prem Tinsulanonda	1988
1988	Giorgio Vecchi		Ciriaco De Mita	Chatichai Choonhavan	1992
1992	Leopoldo Ferri de Lazara		Giuliano Amato	Suchinda Kraprayoon	1996
1996	Mario Piersigilli		Romano Prodi	Chavalit Yongchaiyudh	2001
2001	Stefano Starace Janfolla		Silvio Berlusconi	Thaksin Shinawatra	2005
2005	Ignazio Di Pace		Silvio Berlusconi	Thaksin Shinawatra	2009
2009	Michelangelo Pipan		Silvio Berlusconi	Thaksin Shinawatra	2013
2013	Francesco Saverio Nisio		Silvio Berlusconi	Thaksin Shinawatra	2018
2018	Lorenzo Galanti	(* 1968 in Stuttgart )	Giuseppe Conte	Prayut Chan-o-cha	2021
