= Andrea Ferrero =

Italian ambassador (1903–1996)

- Ferrero (left) with Christiaan Barnard (centre) and Golda Meir (right)

Italian Ambassador to Uruguay
- In office 2 December 1958 – 15 August 1962
- Preceded by: Enrico Martino
- Succeeded by: Lamberto Forino

Italian Ambassador to Czechoslovakia
- In office 27 September 1962 – 2 April 1964
- Preceded by: Enrico Aillaud
- Succeeded by: Remigio Danilo Grillo

Italian Ambassador to Thailand
- In office 1965 – 1 December 1968
- Preceded by: Ezio Mizzan
- Succeeded by: Eugenio Rubino

Italian Ambassador to Egypt (chargé)
- In office 1951–1953
- Preceded by: Renato Prunas
- Succeeded by: Pasquale Iannelli

Personal details
- Born: 18 November 1903 Bianzè (Vercelli)
- Died: 10 June 1996 (aged 92) Rome
- Spouse: Orietta Ferrero
- Education: University of Turin
- Awards: Grand Officer of the Order of Merit of the Italian Republic

Andrea Ferrero (18 Novembre 1903 – 10 June 1996) was an Italian diplomat. After graduating in law in Turin, he joined Italy's foreign service, working as a diplomat in Washington, D.C., Pittsburgh, New York City, Moscow, and Athens. After World War II he became Second Secretary in London. In this capacity, he helped with the repatriation of Italian prisoners of war.

Ferrero then served as Counsellor in Cairo from 1950 to 1954, during the critical times of the Egyptian Revolution. In that period, the Italian ambassador to Egypt died and Italy, following the dictates of the British, did not appoint a new ambassador, in order to avoid to specify whether the new representative would be accredited to King Farouk as King of Egypt or King of Egypt and Sudan. Thus Ferrero became the chargé d'affaires, providing reports about the conflict in this capacity.

In the mid-1950s he served as Consul General in Geneva and Italian Delegate to the United Nations in the same city. Ferrero then served as Italian Ambassador to Uruguay, Italian Ambassador to Czechoslovakia, and finally as Italian Ambassador to Thailand. After his retirement he settled in Rome, where he died on 10 June 1996.

== Biography ==
Born in Bianzè (Vercelli) on 18 November 1903, Andrea Ferrero earned a degree in law at the University of Turin in 1926. He joined Italy's foreign service in 1928. He served in Washington (1932–1933), in Pittsburg (1935–1936), in New York (1936–1938) as Deputy Consul, in Moscow (1938–1941) and in Athens (1941–1943).

After the War he served in London as Second Secretary (1945–1947) where he dealt with the repatriation of Italian prisoners of war and in Cairo (1950–1954) as Counsellor. Ferrero was in Egypt during the 1952 Coup d'état by Mohamed Naguib and Gamal Abdel Nasser. Prior to the start of the revolution, on 29 January 1952, he wrote a report to Italy's Ministry of Foreign Affairs, noting that the king then had "all the levers of command in his hands", adding that "the developments therefore depend on him and on the discretion of the English [i.e. British] requests." He was in Alexandria when Free Officers Movement's tanks surrounded the royal palace, wherein Farouk had barricaded himself, providing Italy's Ministry of Foreign Affairs with the latest news. During the troubled times of the coup, Italy, following the line of conduct of other countries (dictated by the British), didn't appoint a new ambassador after the Italian ambassador to Egypt Renato Prunas during the Christmas night of 1951, leaving its embassy in the hands of Ferrero. Had Italy appointed a new ambassador, they would've had to specify whether the ambassador was accredited to Farouk, King of Egypt, or Farouk, King of Egypt and Sudan. Thus Rome decided to buy time, leaving the embassy in the hands of Ferrero, who became the chargé d'affaires, thus complying with the British request of not acknowledging the union of the two crowns. After a few months, however, Rome become worried that the ongoing situation might compromise its relations with Egypt, and thus made a "half-step forward" by communicating to Cairo that they were planning to appoint diplomat Giovanni Fornari as successor of Prunas. Such action was planned to satisfy the Egyptians without angering the British, but eventually, after Egyptian journals claimed that the news of the announcement of the planned appointment of Fornari came with the acknowledgment of Farouk as King of Sudan, the British grew mildly dissatisfied.

In 1954-1955 he was Consul General in Geneva and Italian Delegate to the United Nations in Geneva.

Ferrero became the Italian Ambassador to Uruguay, succeeding Enrico Martino, on 2 December 1958, and held this office until 1962, being succeeded by Lamberto Forino. He was Ambassador of Italy to Czechoslovakia from September 1962 until April 1964. He later succeeded Ezio Mizzan as Italian Ambassador to Thailand, holding the office from 1965 until 1 December 1968, being succeeded by Eugenio Rubino in 1969.

He was married to Orietta Ferrero, who traveled the world with him due to his occupation. She had a collection of porcelain parrots, which she bought around the world. They lived in a house in Rome very close to the Church of the Gesù.

Ferrero died in Rome on 10 June 1996.

== Honors ==
Order of Merit of the Italian Republic 2nd Class / Grand Officer – 1962

== Publications ==
- 2023 - Episodi diplomatici. (Chicago, 1933, Atene,1942) (edited by Stefano Baldi) in Quaderni della Collana Memorie e Studi diplomatici n. 2.

(only digital version)

== See also ==
- Ministry of Foreign Affairs (Italy)
- Foreign relations of Italy
