= List of ambassadors of Italy to Pakistan =

Ambassador of Italy to Pakistan
- Emblem of Italy
- Incumbent; Andreas Ferrarese since 2020
- Style: His Excellency
- Inaugural holder: Augusto Assettati
- Formation: 1948

The Italian ambassador to Pakistan is the ambassador of the Italian Government to the Government of Pakistan.

Since 1948 Italy and Pakistan maintain diplomatic relations.

== List of representatives ==
Diplomatic accreditation	Ambassador	Observations	List of prime ministers of Italy	List of heads of government of Pakistan	Term end
August 10, 1948	Augusto Assettati		Alcide De Gasperi	Liaquat Ali Khan	
September 18, 1951	Omero Formentini		Alcide De Gasperi	Liaquat Ali Khan	
September 12, 1953	Benedetto D'Acunzo		Giuseppe Pella	Mohammad Ali Bogra	
February 26, 1955	Alberto Calisse		Mario Scelba	Mohammad Ali Bogra	
December 12, 1957	Manlio Castronuovo		Adone Zoli	Ibrahim Ismail Chundrigar	
December 12, 1960	Sergio Koliancich	Military rule	Amintore Fanfani	Field Marshal Ayub Khan	
June 11, 1962	Adalberto Figarolo di Gropello	Military rule	Amintore Fanfani	Field Marshal Ayub Khan	
December 8, 1964	Luca Dainelli	Military rule	Aldo Moro	Field Marshal Ayub Khan	
August 23, 1966	Ezio Mizzan	Military rule	Aldo Moro	Field Marshal Ayub Khan	
October 3, 1969	Franco Bounous	Military rule	Mariano Rumor	General Yahya Khan	
March 15, 1973	Oberto Fabiani		Giulio Andreotti	Zulfikar Ali Bhutto	
May 29, 1977	Gerardo Zampaglione		Giulio Andreotti	Zulfikar Ali Bhutto	
November 25, 1979	Paolo Torella di Romagnano	Military rule	Francesco Cossiga	General Muhammad Zia-ul-Haq	
July 18, 1984	Amedeo De Franchis	Military rule	Bettino Craxi	General Muhammad Zia-ul-Haq	
January 7, 1988	Arduino Fornara	Military rule	Giovanni Goria	General Muhammad Zia-ul-Haq	
April 15, 1992	Pietro Rinaldi		Giulio Andreotti	Nawaz Sharif	
October 31, 1996	Enrico Gerardo De Maio		Romano Prodi	Benazir Bhutto	
January 25, 2001	Angelo Gabriele De Ceglie	Military rule	Giuliano Amato	General Pervez Musharraf	
June 9, 2004	Roberto Mazzotta		Silvio Berlusconi	Zafarullah Khan Jamali	
February 26, 2008	Vincenzo Prati		Romano Prodi	Muhammad Mian Soomro	
July 12, 2012	Adriano Chiodi Cianfarani		Mario Monti	Raja Pervaiz Ashraf	
October 19, 2015	Stefano Pontecorvo		Matteo Renzi	Nawaz Sharif	
June 11, 2020	Andreas Ferrarese		Giuseppe Conte	Imran Khan	
