= Luca Dainelli =

Italian diplomat

Italian Ambassador to Pakistan
- In office 8 December 1964 – 23 August 1966
- Preceded by: Adalberto Figarolo di Gropello
- Succeeded by: Ezio Mizzan

Luca Dainelli was an Italian diplomat.

Dainelli was the 8th Italian Ambassador to Pakistan. He is also remembered for making, in a March 1978 deposition, some unfounded accusations against Aldo Moro, in an attempt to exonerate Giovanni Leone. Beside being Italian ambassador to Pakistan, Dainelli was also Italian vice-consul in New York City.
