= List of ambassadors of Italy to Cyprus =

Ambassador of Italy to Cyprus
- Emblem of Italy
- Incumbent; Andrea Cavallari since September 25, 2017
- Inaugural holder: Pietro Solari
- Formation: September 12, 1961

The Italian ambassador in Nicosia is the official representative of the Government in Rome to the Government of Cyprus.

== List of representatives ==
Diplomatic accreditation	Ambassador	Observations	List of prime ministers of Italy	President of Cyprus	Term end
September 12, 1961	Pietro Solari		Fernando Tambroni	Makarios III	
November 18, 1964	Mario Battisti	Chargé d'affaires	Giovanni Leone	Makarios III	
June 9, 1965	Franco Bounous		Giovanni Leone	Makarios III	
September 29, 1969	Alessandro Capece Minutolo di Bugnano		Giovanni Leone	Makarios III	
September 9, 1972	Vittoriano Manfredi		Giulio Andreotti	Makarios III	
September 23, 1975	Romano Rossetti		Aldo Moro	Makarios III	
October 23, 1978	Georgio Stea-Antonini		Giulio Andreotti	Spyros Kyprianou	
May 8, 1981	Ugo Toscano		Giovanni Spadolini	Spyros Kyprianou	
November 23, 1986	Paolo Valfrè di Bonzo		Bettino Craxi	Spyros Kyprianou	
January 10, 1989	Guido Rizzo Venci		Giulio Andreotti	George Vasiliou	
March 16, 1993	Graziella Simbolotti		Carlo Azeglio Ciampi	Glafkos Klerides	
July 5, 1997	Francesco Bascone		Romano Prodi	Glafkos Klerides	
October 1, 2001	Gherardo la Francesca		Silvio Berlusconi	Glafkos Klerides	
September 30, 2005	Luigi Napolitano		Silvio Berlusconi	Tassos Papadopoulos	
December 1, 2009	Alfredo Bastianelli		Silvio Berlusconi	Demetris Christofias	
January 14, 2013	Guido Cerboni		Enrico Letta	Demetris Christofias	
September 25, 2017	Andrea Cavallari		Paolo Gentiloni	Nicos Anastasiades	
