= Alberto Pariani =

Italian General (1876–1955)

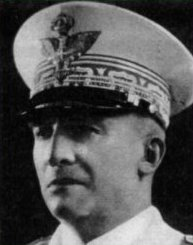

Chief of Staff of the Royal Italian Army
- In office 7 October 1936 – 3 November 1939
- Preceded by: Federico Baistrocchi
- Succeeded by: Rodolfo Graziani

Personal details
- Born: November 27, 1876 Milan, Kingdom of Italy
- Died: March 1, 1955 (aged 78) Malcesine, Italy

Military service
- Allegiance: Kingdom of Italy
- Branch/service: Royal Italian Army
- Years of service: 1914–1939; 1943–1945
- Rank: General (1933)
- Unit: 11th Infantry Division "Brennero"; 6th Alpini Regiment
- Battles/wars: World War I; Italian Front; World War II; Operation Achse

Alberto Pariani (27 November 1876, Milan – 1 March 1955) was an Italian general.

He fought during the First World War, and ended the war as a commander of the 6th Alpini Regiment. From 1925 to 1926 he was Operations Chief of the Army General Staff. From 1927 to 1933, he served as a military attaché to Albania, which became the Albanian Kingdom in 1928, and simultaneously as head of the Italian Military Mission in the country.

He was promoted to full general in 1933 and named commander of the 11th Division Brennero until 1934. From 1934 to 1936 he was Deputy Chief of the General Staff, and from 1936 to 1939 he was Chief of the General Staff and Under-Secretary of War.

In 1939 he retired, but in 1943 he was recalled as the general commander of the Italian Crown forces operating in the Italian protectorate in Albania and as the Luogotenente del Re (Viceroy) of Albania (replacing Francesco Jacomoni di San Savino). In Albania, he resided with his family in the Royal Palace of Tirana.

In September 1943, at the moment of the Italian armistice, he was captured by the German Army and arrested. He was also arrested at the end of the Second World War for crimes alleged to have been committed during service in the Fascist regime, from which he was acquitted in 1947. He then became Mayor of the town of Malcesine from 1952 to 1955.

Government offices
Preceded by Francesco Jacomoni	Lieutenant-General of the King in Albania; 1943	Succeeded by Office abolished
