= Botanical Gardens (Tirana) =

Botanical gardens in Tirana, Albania

Coordinates: 41°18′37″N 19°48′22″E

Botanical Gardens of Tirana
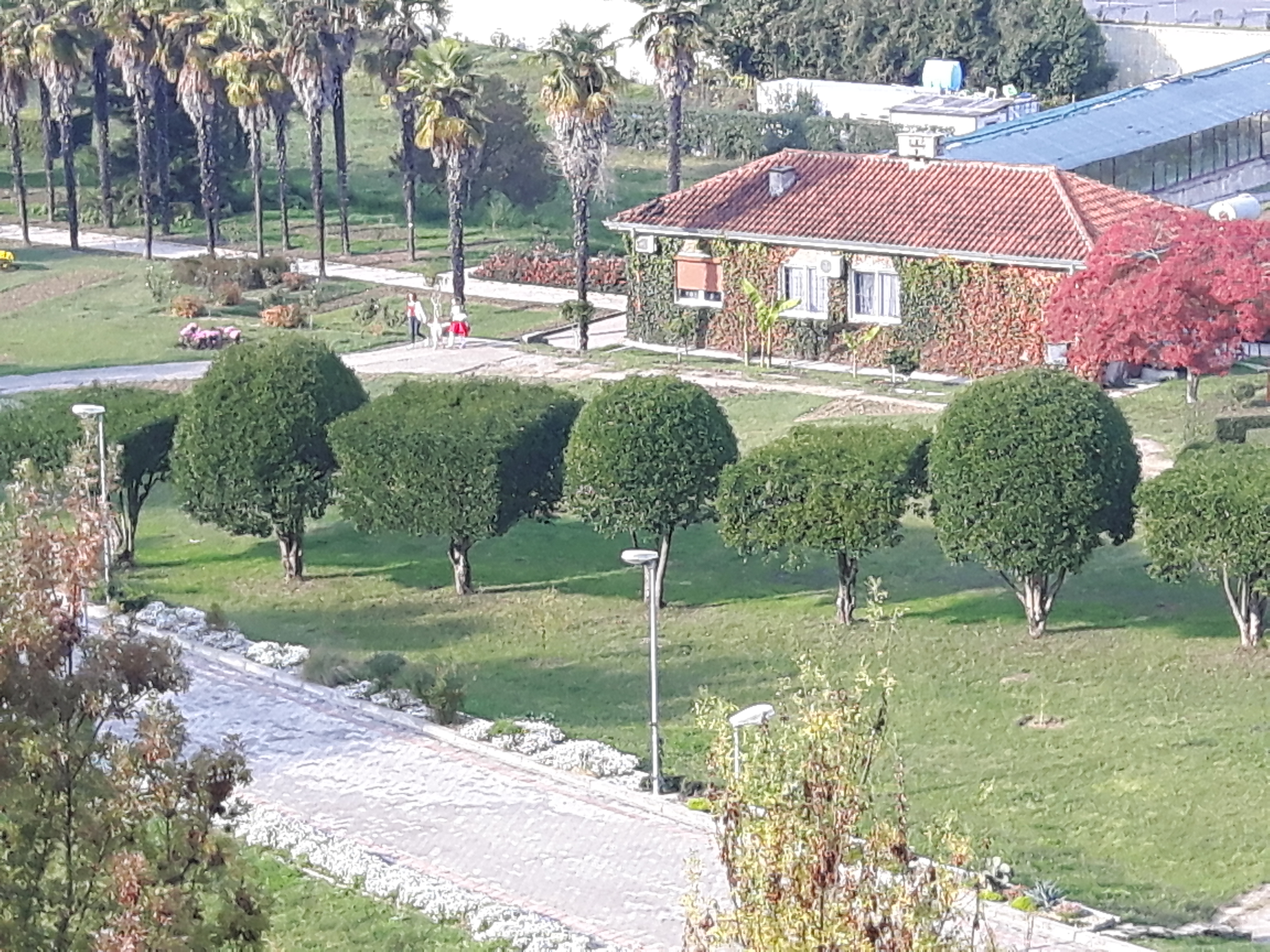
- Botanical Garden in Tirana
- Interactive map of Botanical Gardens of Tirana
- Type: Botanical Garden
- Location: Tirana, Albania
- Area: 15 hectares (37 acres)
- Opened: 1964
- Owner: University of Tirana
- Plants: 2,000 species
- Website: sites.google.com/fshn.edu.al/qkff/kopshti-botanik?authuser=0

The Botanical Gardens of Tirana is a botanical gardens complex located in southern Tirana, Albania. It is the only botanical gardens complex in Albania.

== History ==
Construction commenced in 1964, with the original site covering approximately 15 hectares. It was completed in 1971. It is situated in southern Tirana.

The Botanical Gardens of Tirana, which are part of the University of Tirana, have become institutionalised with international links with Canadian, Hungarian, Chinese and Romanian gardens.

The garden contains around 2,000 species of plants and is maintained by horticultural experts and scientists who also use the gardens for research. The gardens are part of Botanic Gardens Conservation International.

Areas of study include the ecology of introduced plant species and threatened endemic species. Other areas of study are concentrated in the phytosociological study of the black pine, oak and natural pasture lands.

== See also ==
- List of botanical gardens
