= Francesco Jacomoni =

Italian governor of the protectorate of Albania

Francesco Jacomoni di San Savino
- Born: 31 August 1893; Reggio di Calabria, Kingdom of Italy
- Died: 17 February 1973 (aged 79); Rome, Italy
- Military career
- Allegiance: Kingdom of Italy; Italy
- Branch: (Kingdom of Italy) Royal Italian Army (Italy) Italian Army
- Service years: 1914–1943
- Rank: Lieutenant-General
- Unit: Fortress Artillery
- Conflicts: Italian Front (World War I); Italian invasion of Albania

Viceré Marchese Francesco Jacomoni di San Savino (31 August 1893 – 17 February 1973) was an Italian diplomat and minister to Albania before World War II. He was appointed governor of the Italian protectorate of Albania after its Invasion.

== Biography ==
He was born in Reggio di Calabria on 31 August 1893 to a banker's family. In 1914 he enlisted in the army for his national service. Named Lieutenant of Fortress Artillery in June 1915, Jacomoni participated in the campaigns of the Italian Front of World War I. At the same time, he pursued his studies in Law at the University of Rome, and graduated in July 1916.

In May 1919 he was appointed as a member of the Italian delegation to the Paris Peace Conference, and worked as a liaison with the Austrian, Hungarian and later Bulgarian delegations. In October 1919 he was appointed as secretary in the Italian embassy at Bucharest, a post he held until recalled to the Ministry of Foreign Affairs in August 1920. In the next few years he served in various diplomatic missions and delegations as a secretary, including a brief mission to Albania in April 1926, where he laid much groundwork for the Italo-Albanian Friendship and Mutual Assistance Treaty of November 1926.

On his return, he became a close associate of Dino Grandi, then Undersecretary of Foreign Affairs and soon to become Minister. Initially head of the Ministry's Historical Service but late rising to be deputy head of Grandi's ministerial office, he participated in a number of missions to the Italian delegations to international conferences regarding the Dawes and Young plans, or the London Naval Conference 1930.

In October 1932, Jacomoni married Maja Cavallero, the daughter of General (and later Marshal) Ugo Cavallero. During the next few years, he was engaged mainly in Geneva at the League of Nations. He was appointed as minister to the Kingdom of Albania from 9 September 1936 until shortly after the Italian invasion of Albania in April 1939. On 17 April he was promoted to ambassadorial rank and on 22 April he became the country's Viceroy (Luogotenente del Re, "Lieutenant-General of the King"). Jacomoni retained this post, which made him the country's effective governor, during much of the Italian occupation.

He was replaced with General Alberto Pariani on 18 March 1943, after his policy of severe repression had failed to halt the growth of the Albanian Resistance movement.

After the war, he was tried along with other senior officials of the Fascist regime, and sentenced by the Italian High Court to 24 years imprisonment on 12 March 1945. He was however released with the general amnesty issued by the Italian government in June 1946, and his sentence was finally commuted altogether in March 1948.

He published his memoirs on his tenure in Albania under the title of La politica dell'Italia in Albania in 1965, and died in Rome on 17 February 1973.

Diplomatic posts
Preceded by Mario Indelli	Italian Ambassador to Albania; 1936–1939	Succeeded by Albania occupied by Italy
Government offices
Preceded by Office created	Lieutenant-General of the King in Albania; 1939–1943	Succeeded by Alberto Pariani
