= List of diplomatic missions of Slovenia =

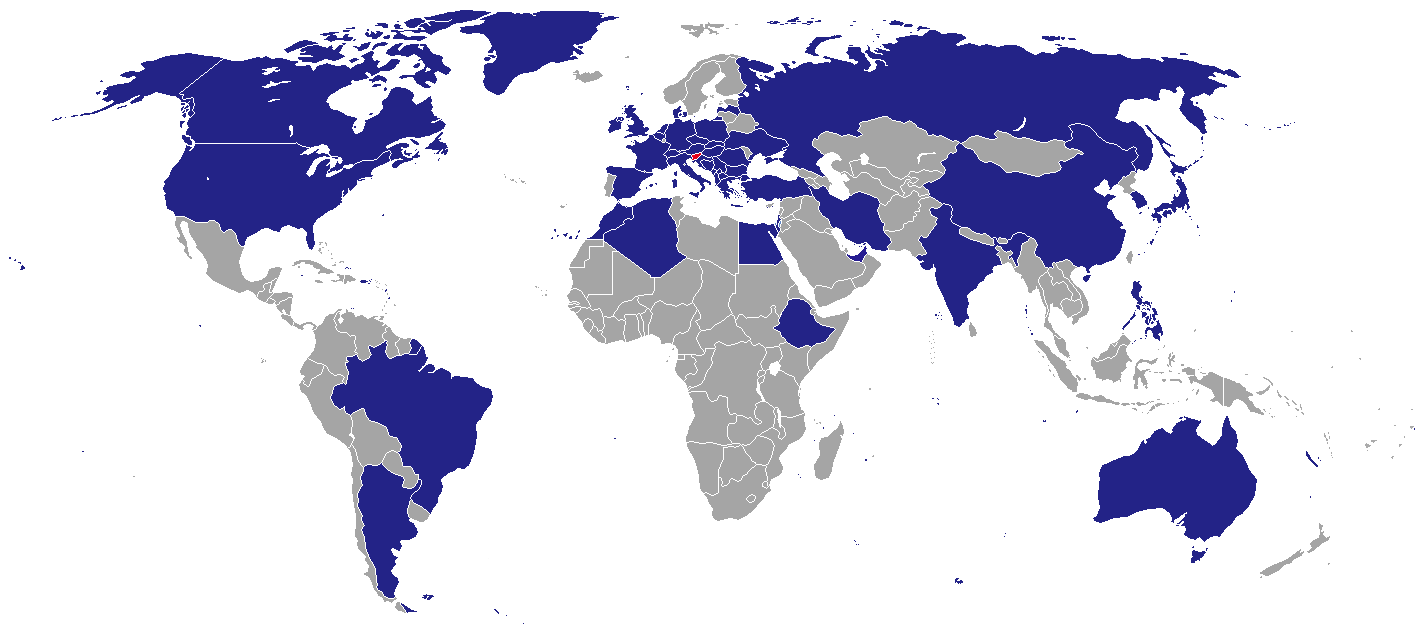
Republic of Slovenia Countries that host Slovenian embassies Countries that host only Slovenian missions that serve as de facto embassies

This is a list of diplomatic missions of Slovenia, excluding honorary consulates.

== Current missions ==
=== Africa ===
Host country	Host city	Mission	Concurrent accreditation	Ref.
Algeria	Algiers	Embassy		
Egypt	Cairo	Embassy	Countries: Jordan; Oman; Saudi Arabia; South Africa; Multilateral Organizations: Arab League (Note: Accredited as an observer mission.)	
Ethiopia	Addis Ababa	Embassy	Countries: Kenya; Multilateral Organizations: African Union	
Morocco	Rabat	Embassy		

=== Americas ===
Host country	Host city	Mission	Concurrent accreditation	Ref.
Argentina	Buenos Aires	Embassy	Countries: Chile; Paraguay; Peru; Uruguay	
Brazil	Brasília	Embassy	Countries: Bolivia; Colombia; Ecuador; Venezuela	
Canada	Ottawa	Embassy	Countries: Cuba; Dominican Republic; Multilateral Organizations: International Civil Aviation Organization	
United States	Washington, D.C.	Embassy	Countries: Costa Rica; Guatemala; Mexico; Panama; Multilateral Organizations: Caribbean Community; Organization of American States	
United States	Cleveland	Consulate-General	Countries: Costa Rica; Guatemala; Mexico; Panama; Multilateral Organizations: Caribbean Community; Organization of American States	

=== Asia ===
Host country	Host city	Mission	Concurrent accreditation	Ref.
China	Beijing	Embassy	Countries: Mongolia; North Korea; Thailand; Vietnam	
China	Shanghai	Consulate	Countries: Mongolia; North Korea; Thailand; Vietnam	
India	New Delhi	Embassy	Countries: Bangladesh; Bhutan; Maldives; Nepal; Sri Lanka	
Iran	Tehran	Embassy	Countries: Pakistan	
Israel	Tel Aviv	Embassy		
Japan	Tokyo	Embassy		
Palestine	Ramallah	Representative office		
Philippines	Manila	Embassy	Multilateral Organizations: Association of Southeast Asian Nations	
South Korea	Seoul	Embassy	Countries: Cambodia; Laos; Singapore	
Turkey	Ankara	Embassy	Countries: Azerbaijan; Iraq; Lebanon	
United Arab Emirates	Abu Dhabi	Embassy	Countries: Bahrain; Kuwait; Qatar; Multilateral Organizations: International Renewable Energy Agency	

=== Europe ===
Host country	Host city	Mission	Concurrent accreditation	Ref.
Albania	Tirana	Embassy		
Austria	Vienna	Embassy		
Austria	Klagenfurt	Consulate-General		
Belgium	Brussels	Embassy	Countries: Cape Verde; Luxembourg	
Bosnia and Herzegovina	Sarajevo	Embassy		
Bosnia and Herzegovina	Banja Luka	Consular office		
Bulgaria	Sofia	Embassy		
Croatia	Zagreb	Embassy		
Czech Republic	Prague	Embassy		
Denmark	Copenhagen	Embassy	Countries: Finland; Iceland; Norway; Sweden	
France	Paris	Embassy	Countries: Monaco; Multilateral Organizations: UNESCO	
Germany	Berlin	Embassy		
Germany	Munich	Consulate-General		
Greece	Athens	Embassy	Countries: Cyprus	
Holy See (Note: The Slovenian Embassy to the Holy See is located outside Vatican territory in Rome.)	Rome	Embassy	Sovereign Entity: Sovereign Military Order of Malta	
Hungary	Budapest	Embassy		
Hungary	Szentgotthárd	Consulate-General		
Ireland	Dublin	Embassy		
Italy	Rome	Embassy	Countries: Malta; San Marino; Tunisia; Multilateral Organizations: Food and Agriculture Organization; International Fund for Agricultural Development; World Food Programme	
Italy	Milan	Consulate-General	Countries: Malta; San Marino; Tunisia; Multilateral Organizations: Food and Agriculture Organization; International Fund for Agricultural Development; World Food Programme	
Italy	Trieste	Consulate-General	Countries: Malta; San Marino; Tunisia; Multilateral Organizations: Food and Agriculture Organization; International Fund for Agricultural Development; World Food Programme	
Kosovo	Pristina	Embassy		
Latvia	Riga	Embassy	Countries: Estonia; Lithuania	
Montenegro	Podgorica	Embassy		
Netherlands	The Hague	Embassy	Multilateral Organizations: OPCW	
North Macedonia	Skopje	Embassy		
Poland	Warsaw	Embassy		
Romania	Bucharest	Embassy	Countries: Moldova	
Russia	Moscow	Embassy	Countries: Belarus; Kyrgyzstan; Tajikistan; Turkmenistan; Uzbekistan	
Serbia	Belgrade	Embassy		
Slovakia	Bratislava	Embassy		
Spain	Madrid	Embassy	Countries: Andorra; Multilateral Organizations: UN Tourism	
Switzerland	Bern	Embassy	Countries: Liechtenstein	
Ukraine	Kyiv	Embassy	Countries: Armenia; Georgia	
United Kingdom	London	Embassy	Multilateral Organizations: International Maritime Organization	

=== Oceania ===
Host country	Host city	Mission	Concurrent accreditation	Ref.
Australia	Canberra	Embassy	Countries: Fiji; Indonesia; Malaysia; New Zealand	

=== Multinational organizations ===
Organization	Host city	Host country	Mission	Concurrent accreditation	Ref.
Council of Europe	Strasbourg	France	Permanent Mission		
European Union	Brussels	Belgium	Permanent Representation		
NATO	Brussels	Belgium	Permanent Representation		
OECD	Paris	France	Permanent Delegation		
United Nations	New York City	United States	Permanent Mission		
United Nations	Geneva	Switzerland	Permanent Mission	Multilateral Organizations: Conference on Disarmament; World Health Organization; World Trade Organization	
United Nations	Vienna	Austria	Permanent Mission	Multilateral Organizations: OSCE; International Atomic Energy Agency; UNCITRAL; UNIDO; United Nations Office on Drugs and Crime	

== Gallery ==
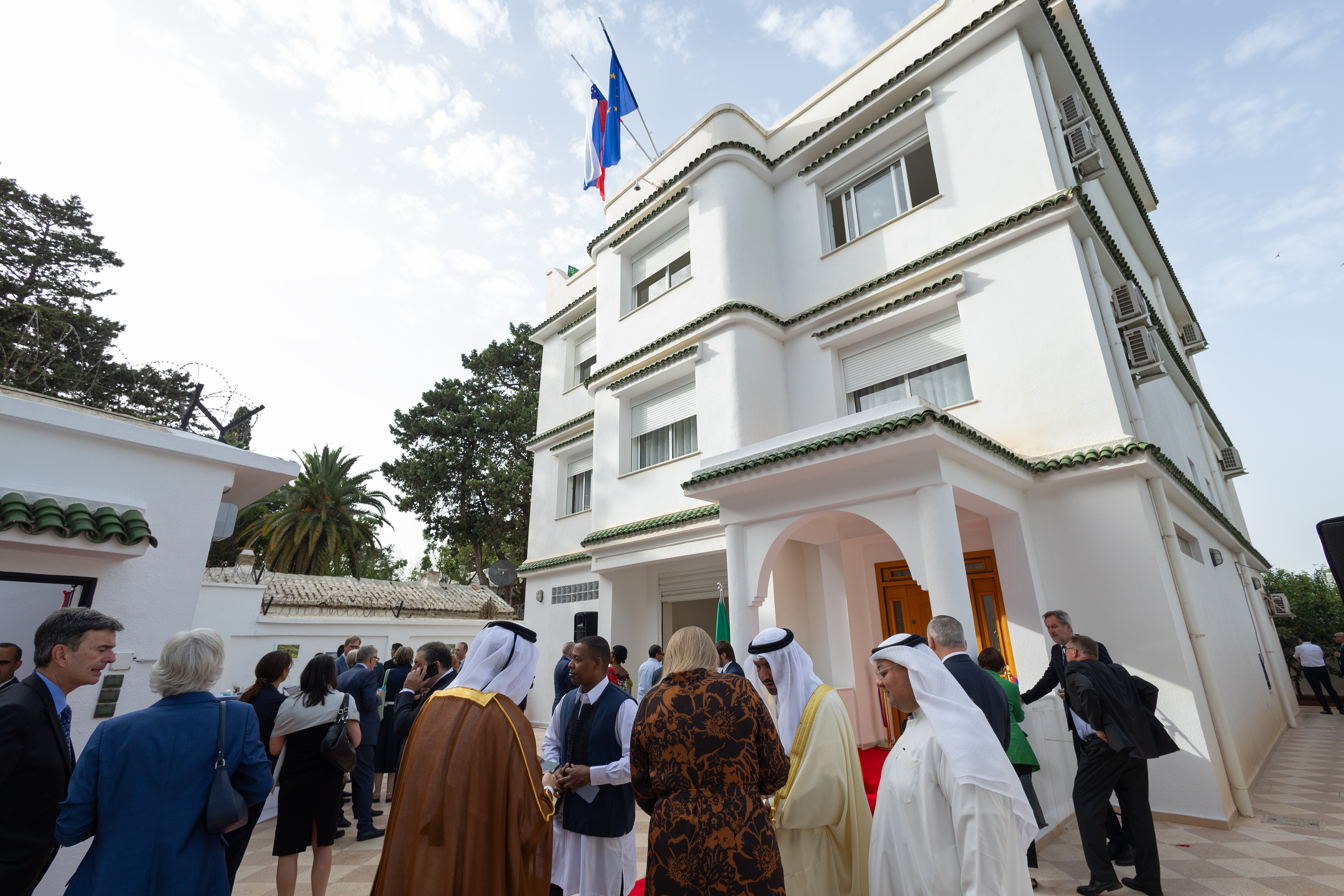
Embassy in Algiers

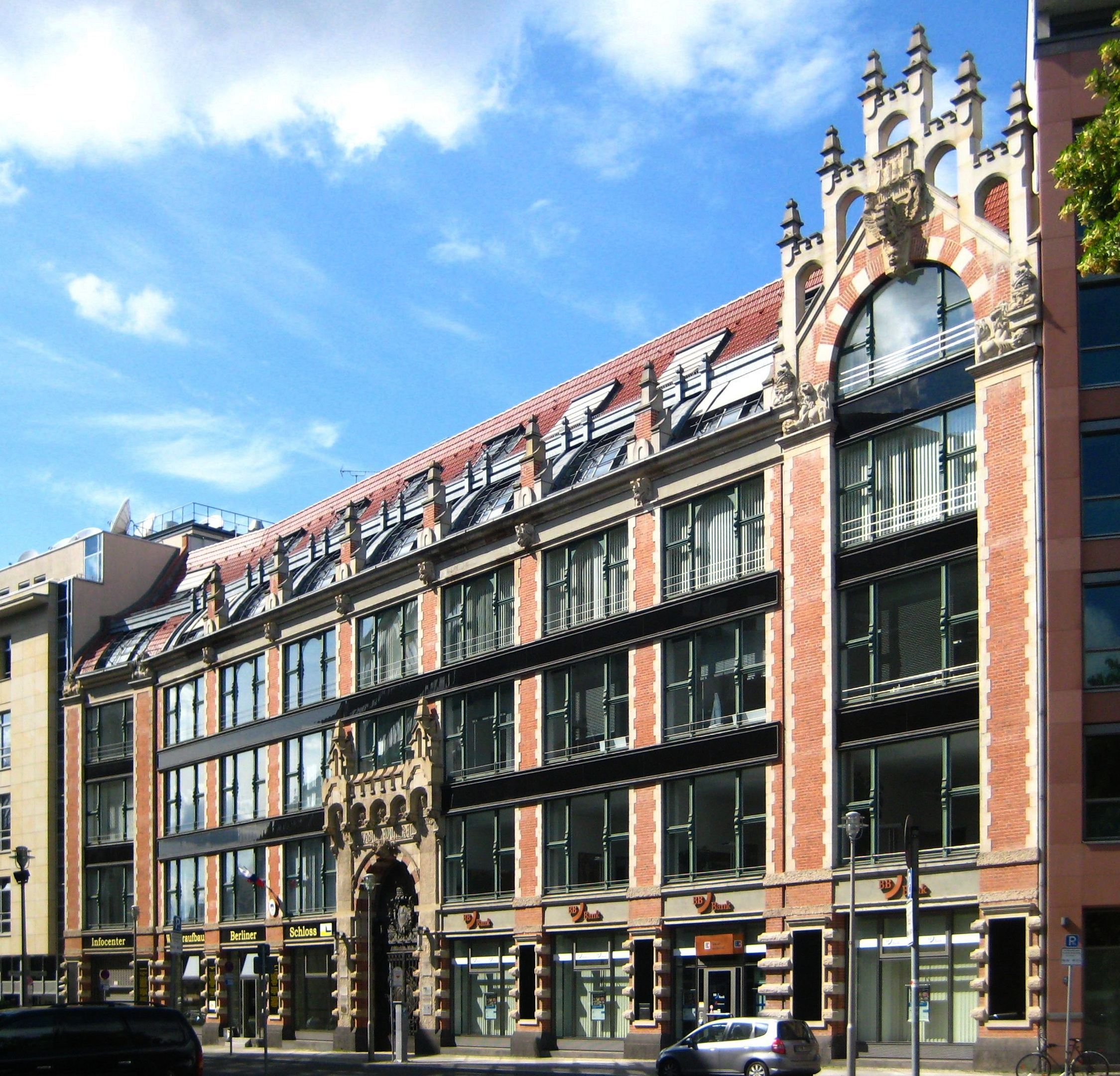
Building hosting the Embassy in Berlin

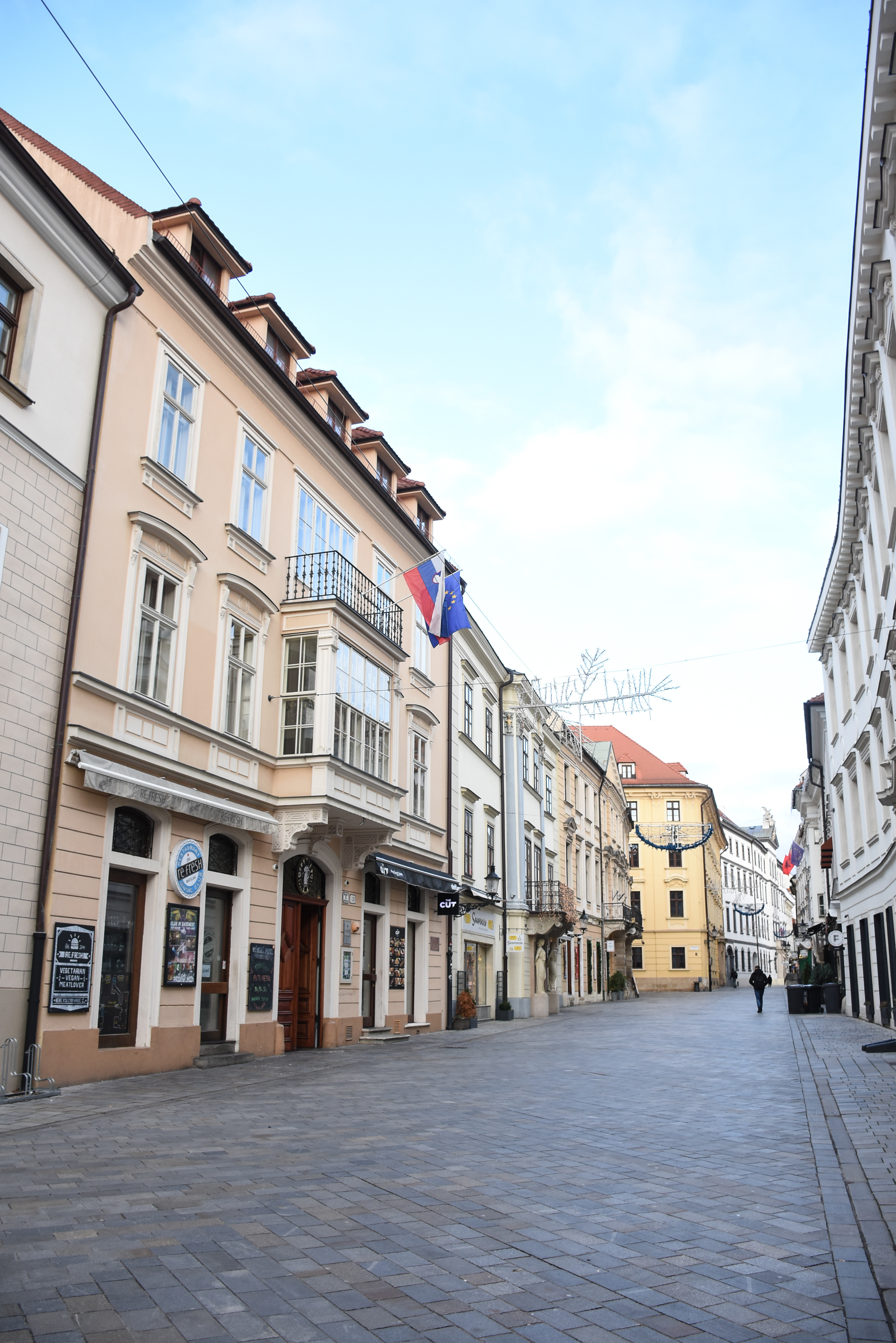
Embassy in Bratislava

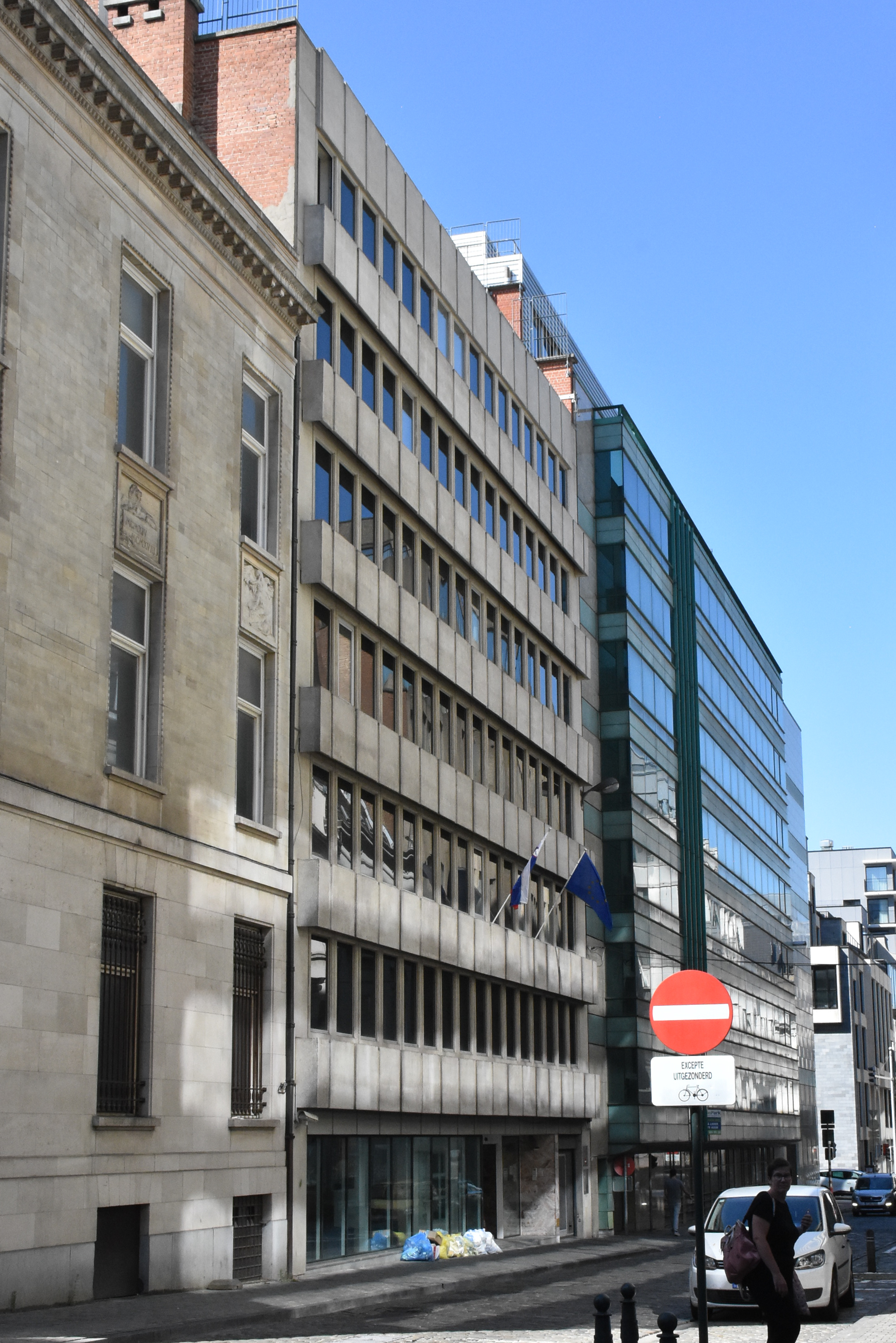
Embassy in Brussels

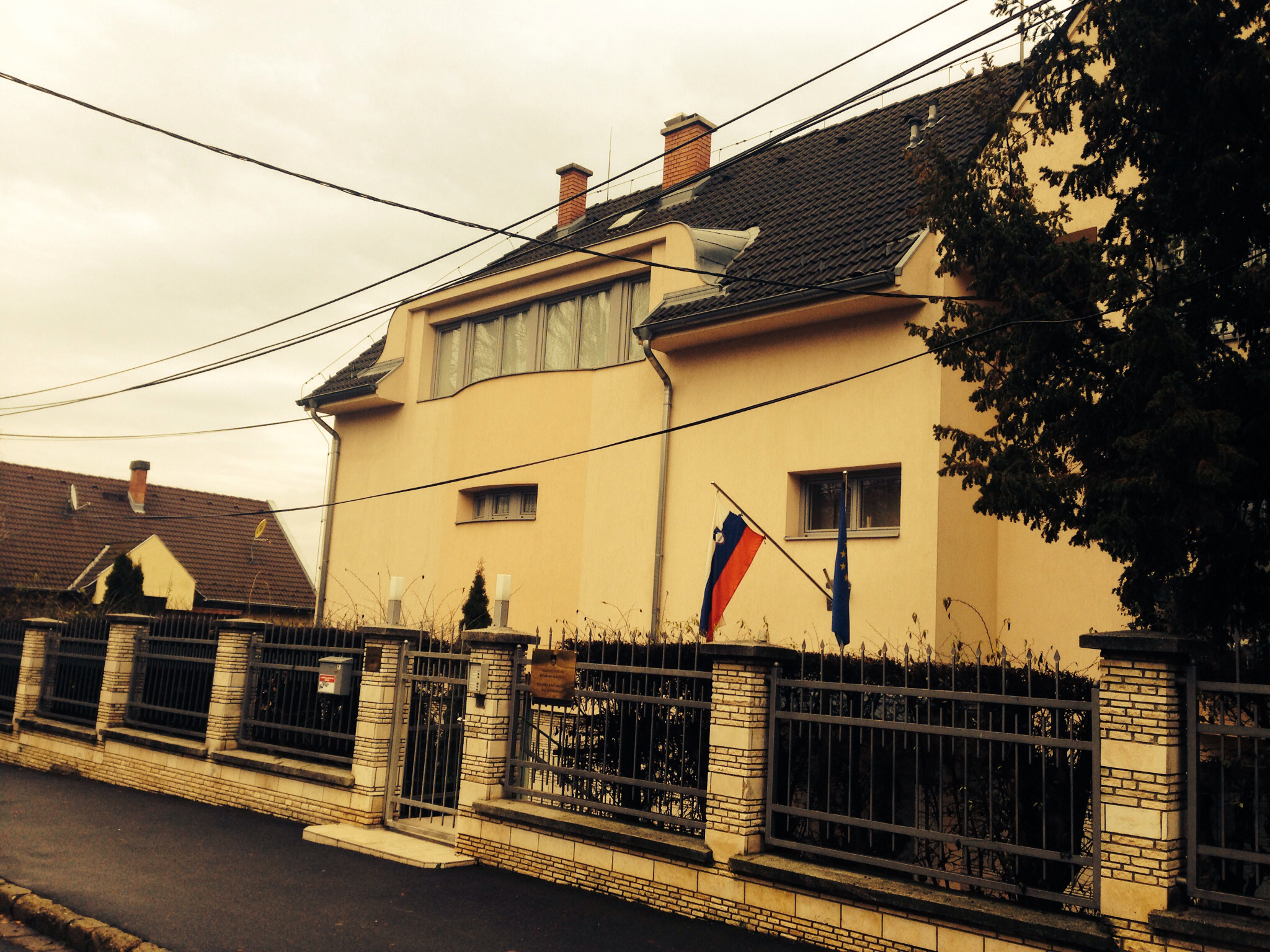
Embassy in Budapest

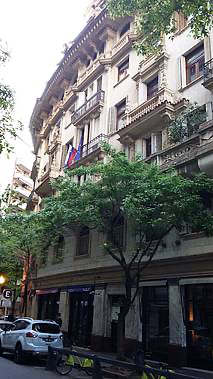
Embassy in Buenos Aires

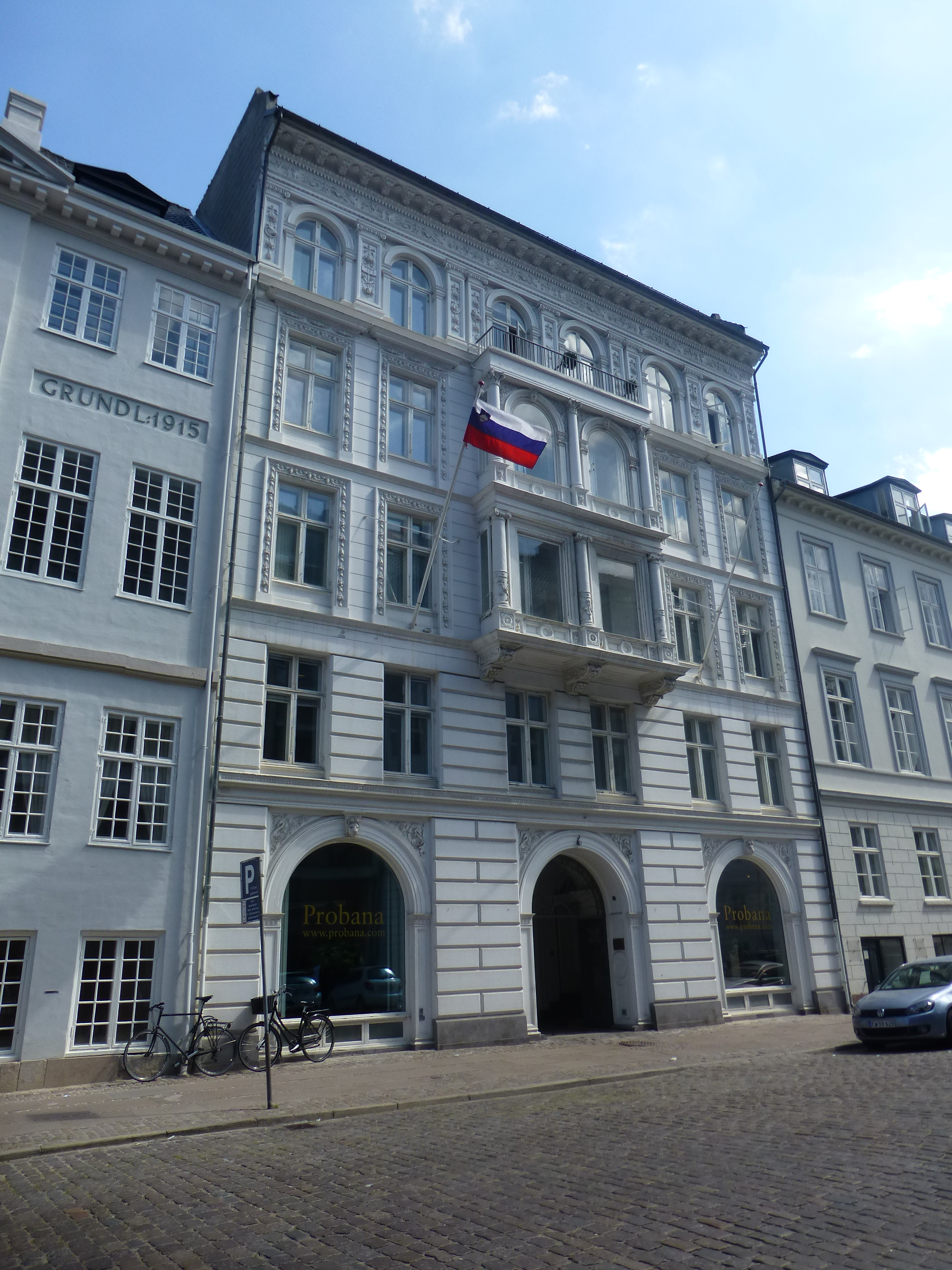
Embassy in Copenhagen

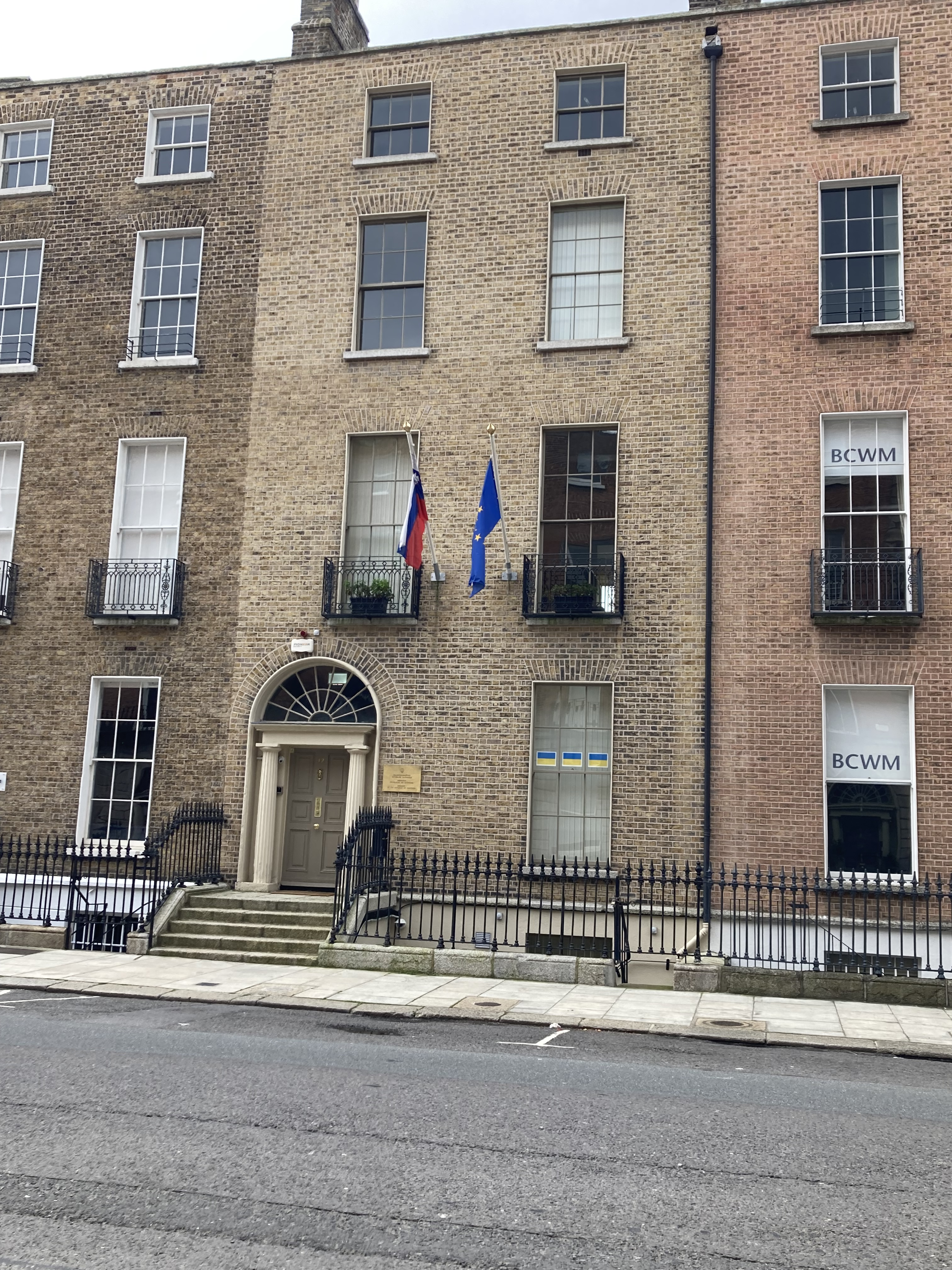
Embassy in Dublin

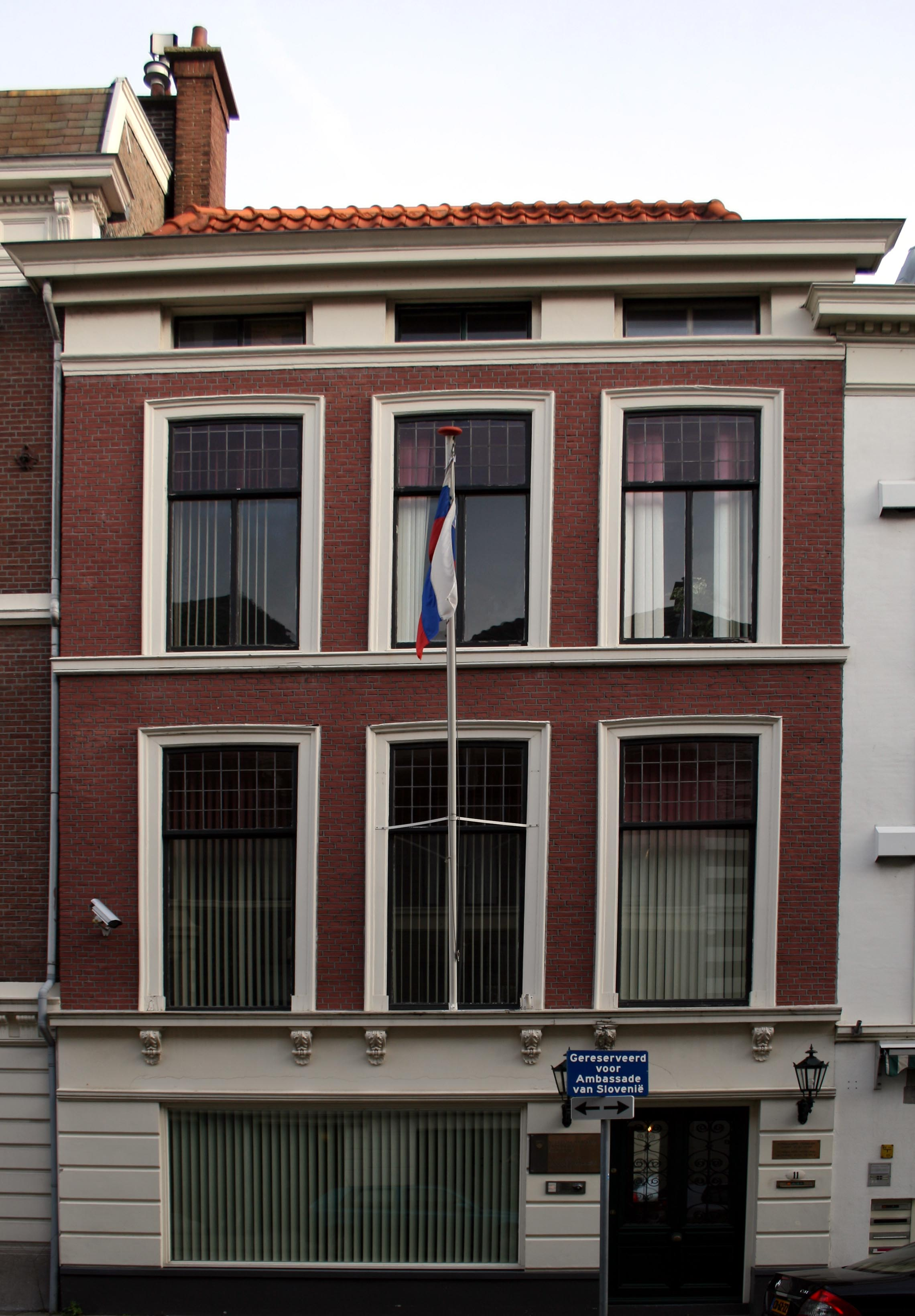
Embassy in The Hague

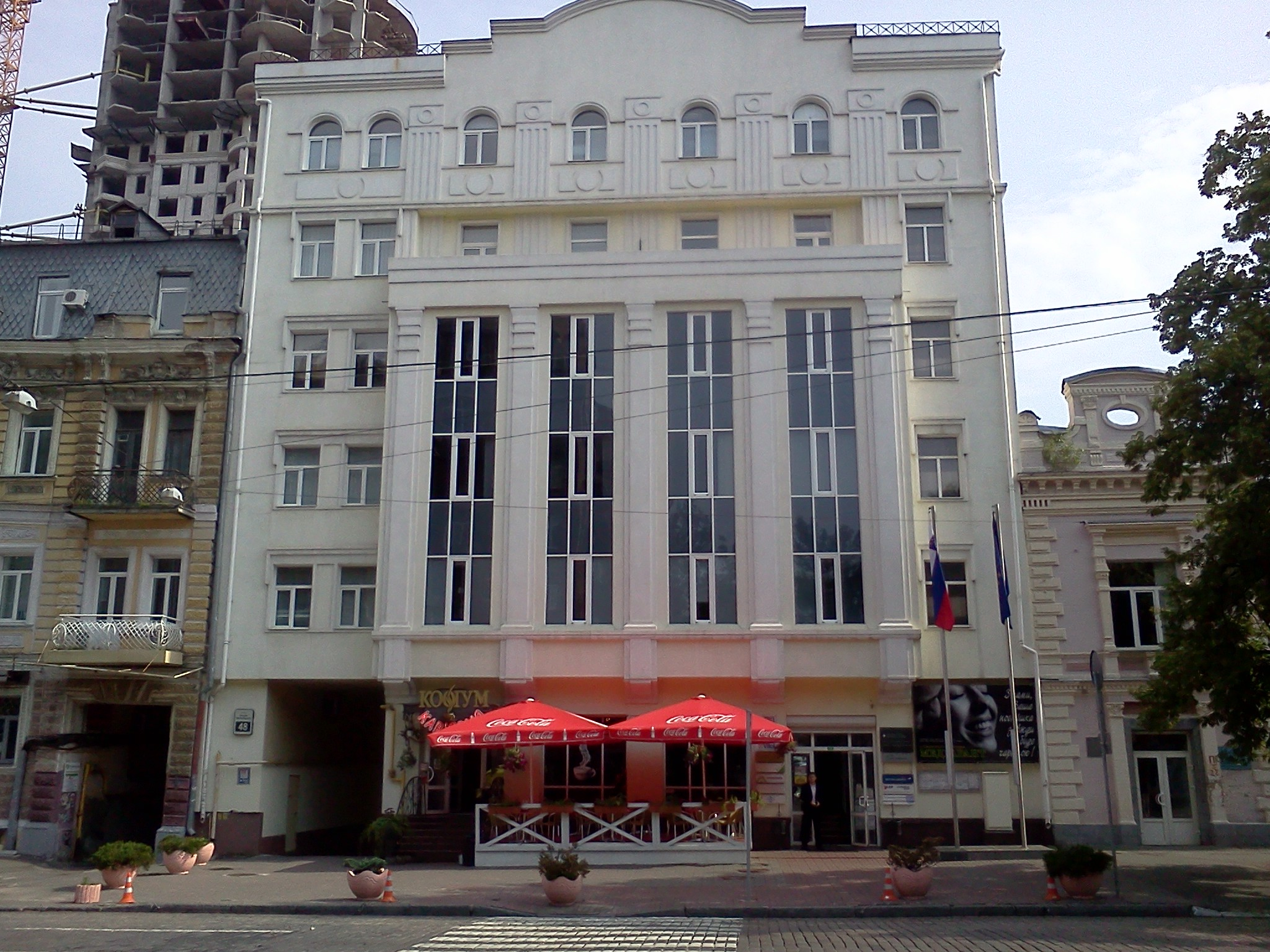
Building hosting the Embassy in Kyiv

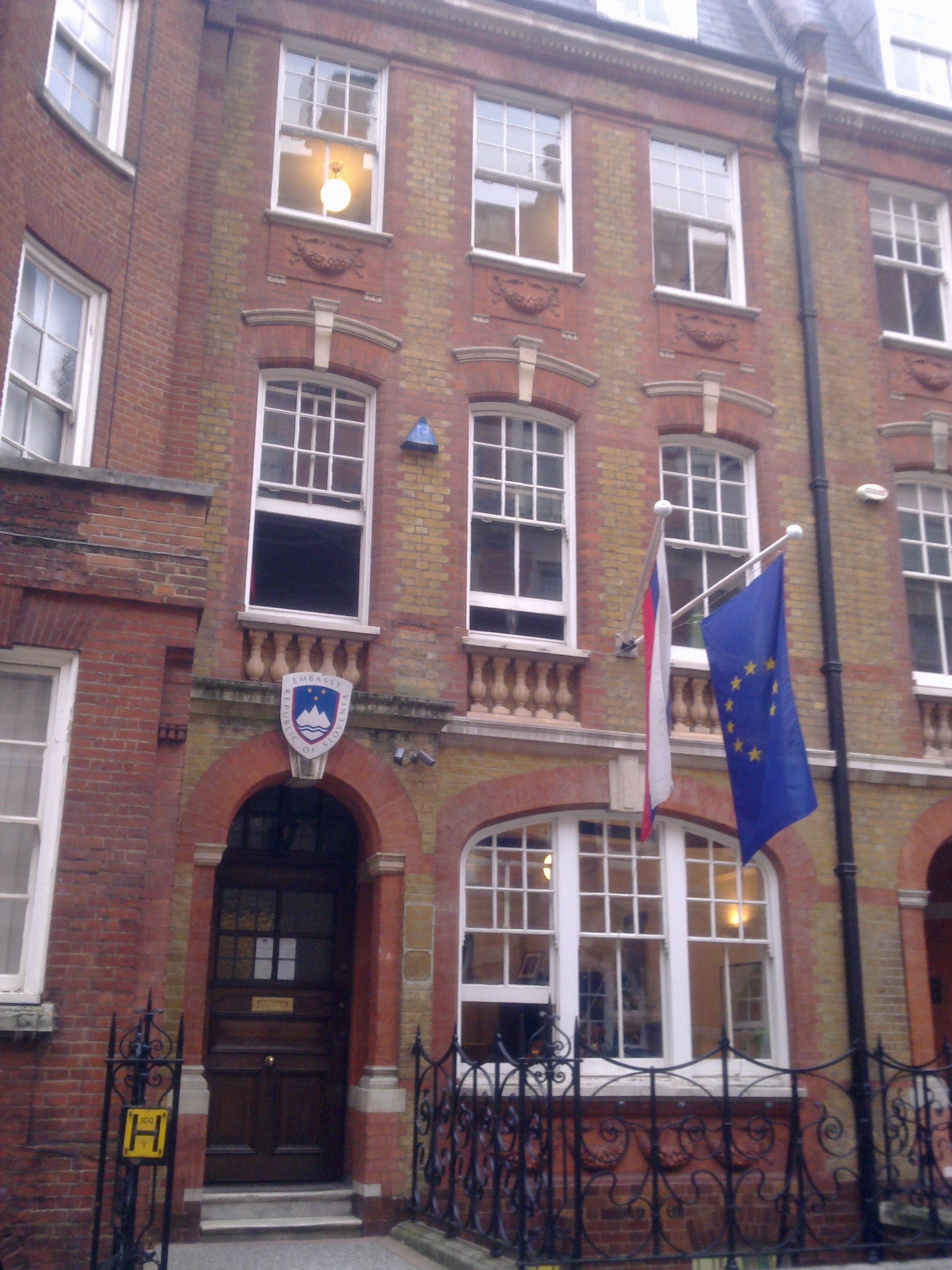
Embassy in London

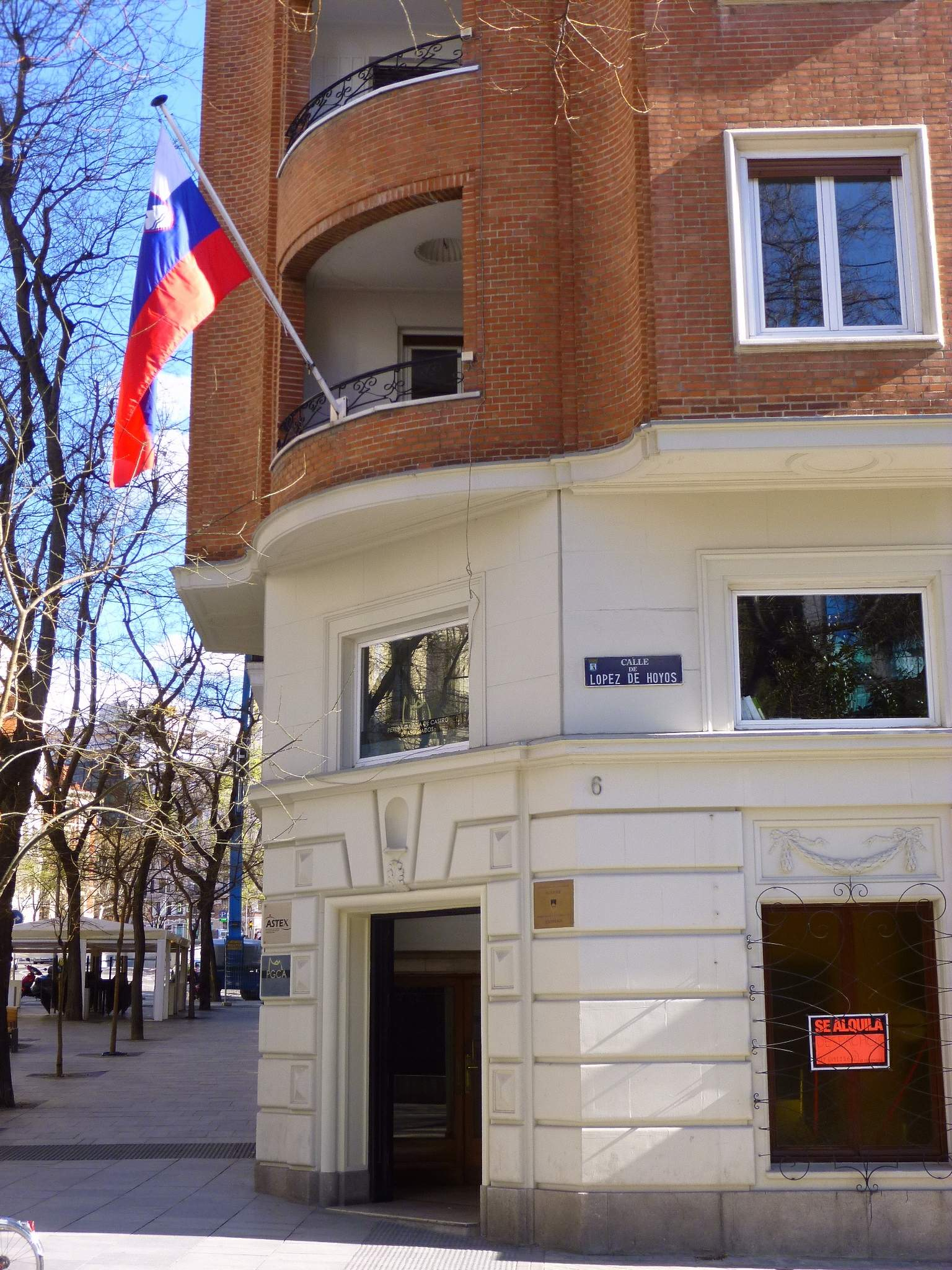
Embassy in Madrid

Building hosting the Embassy in Manila

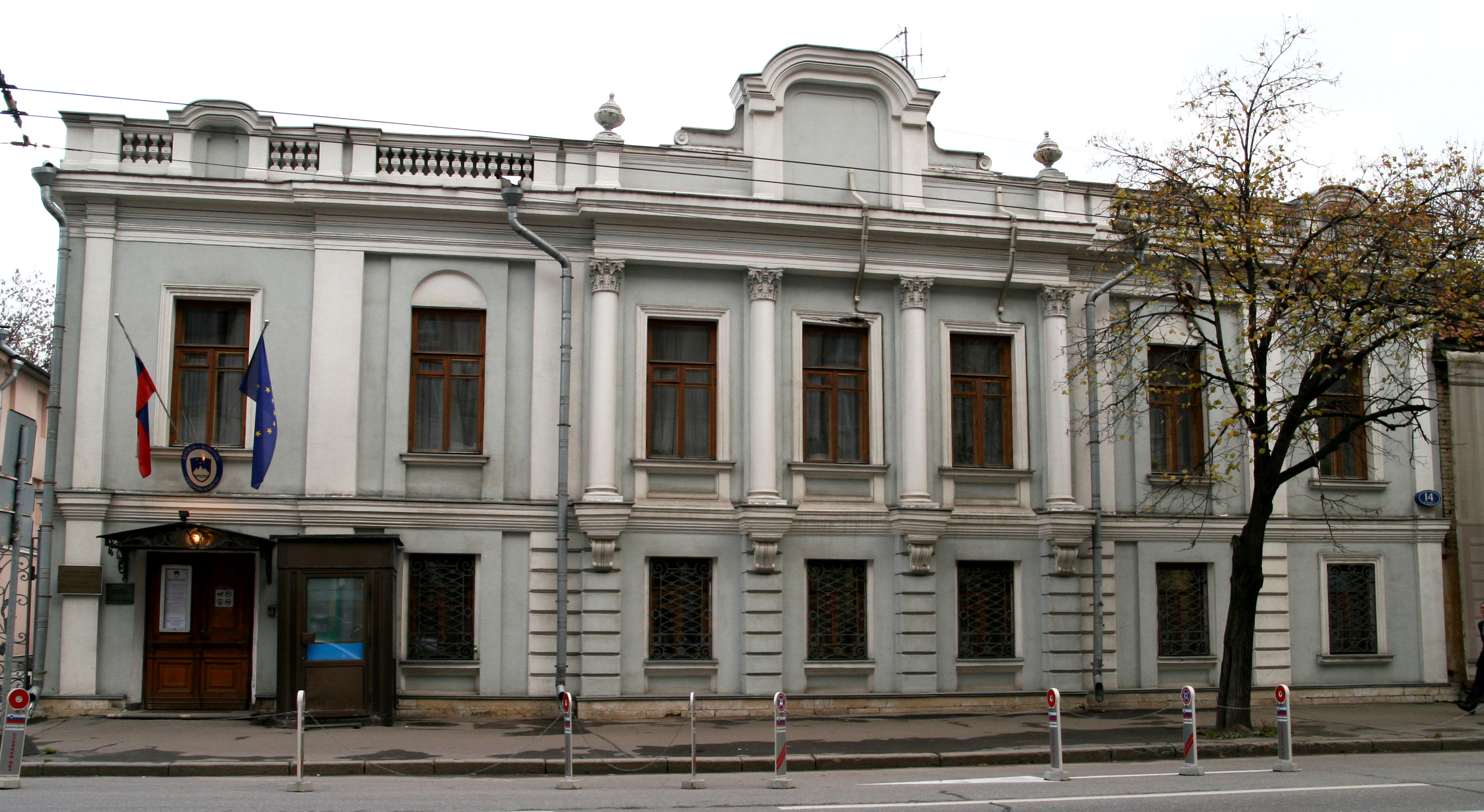
Embassy in Moscow

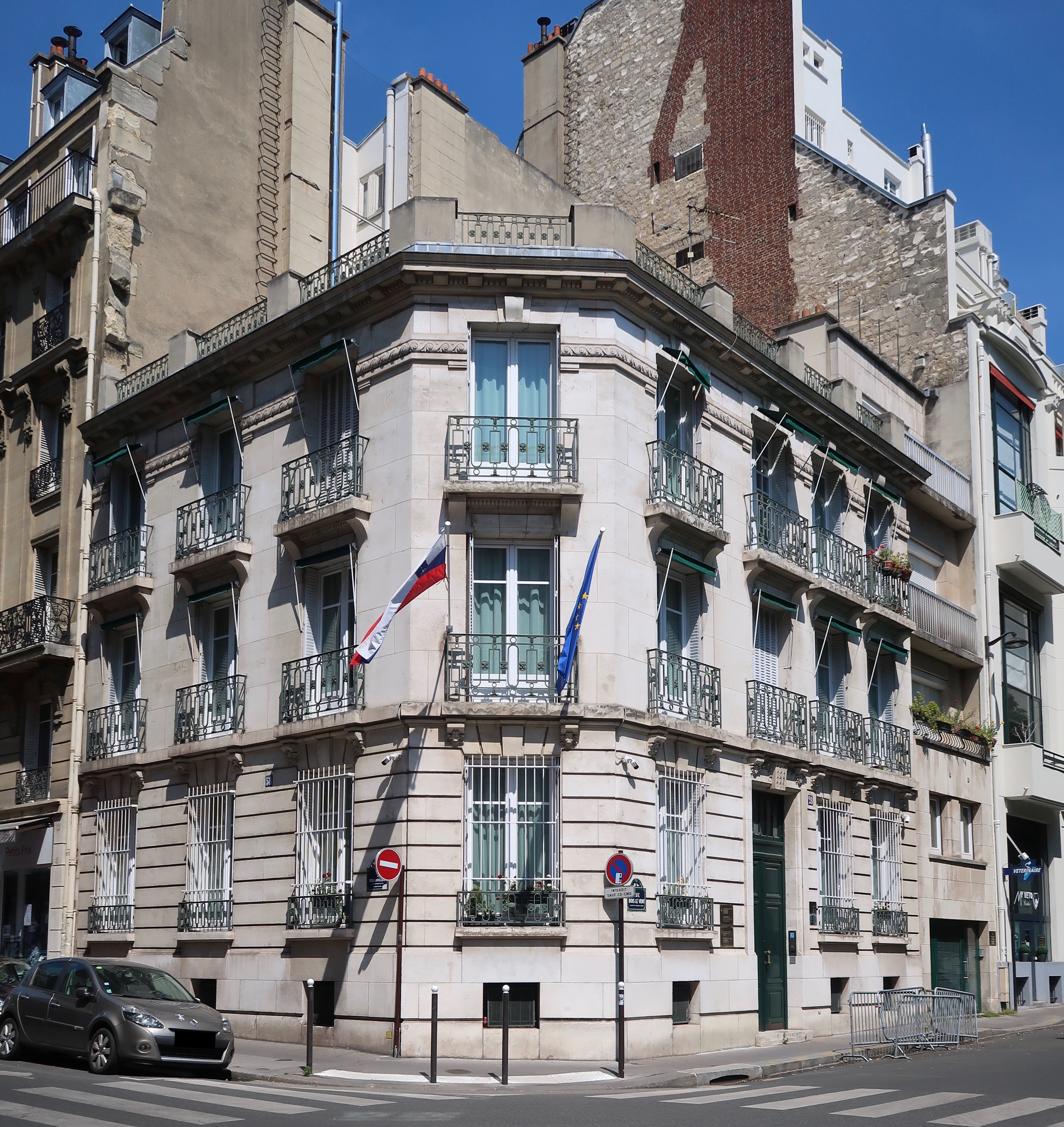
Embassy in Paris

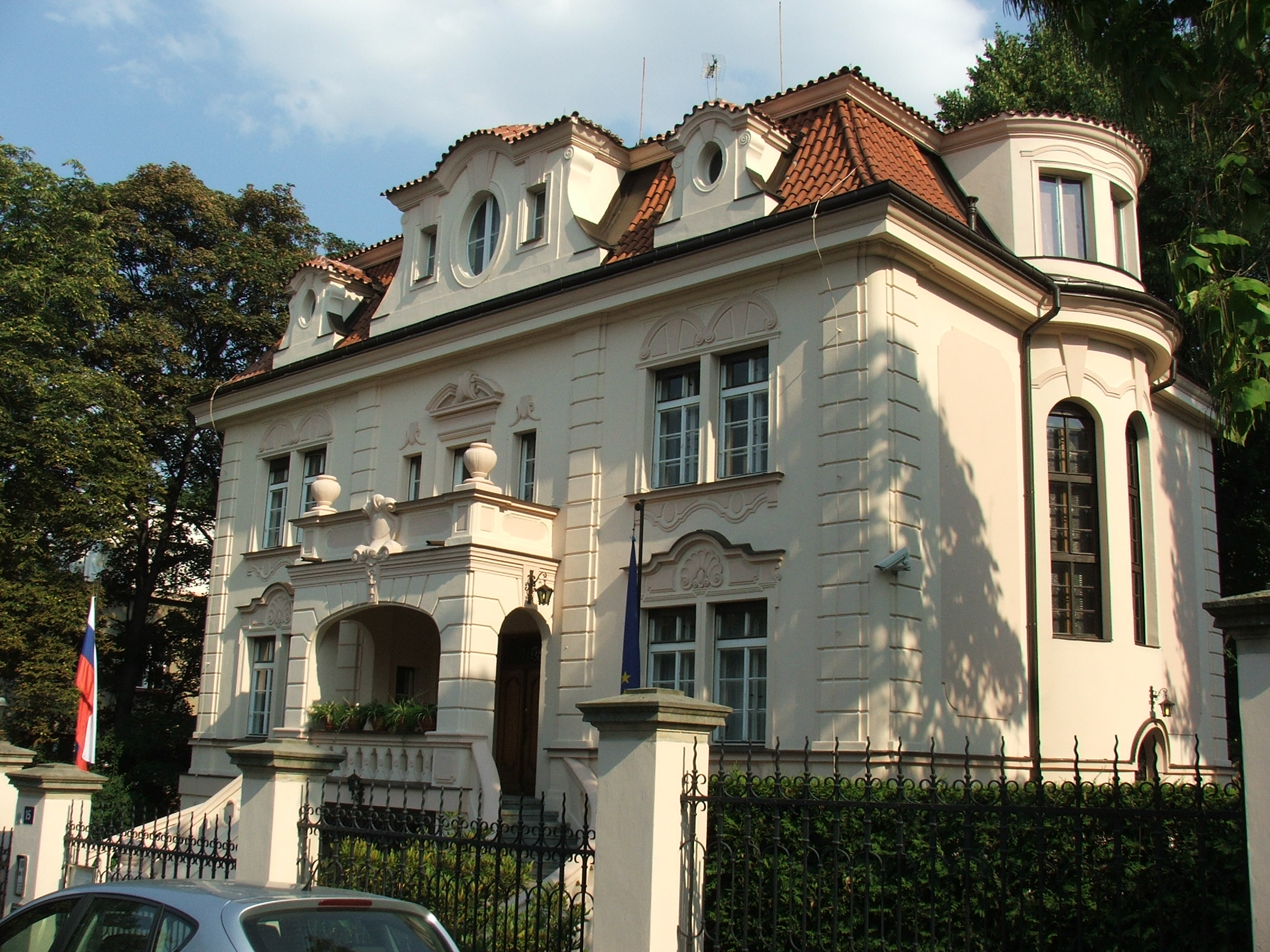
Embassy in Prague

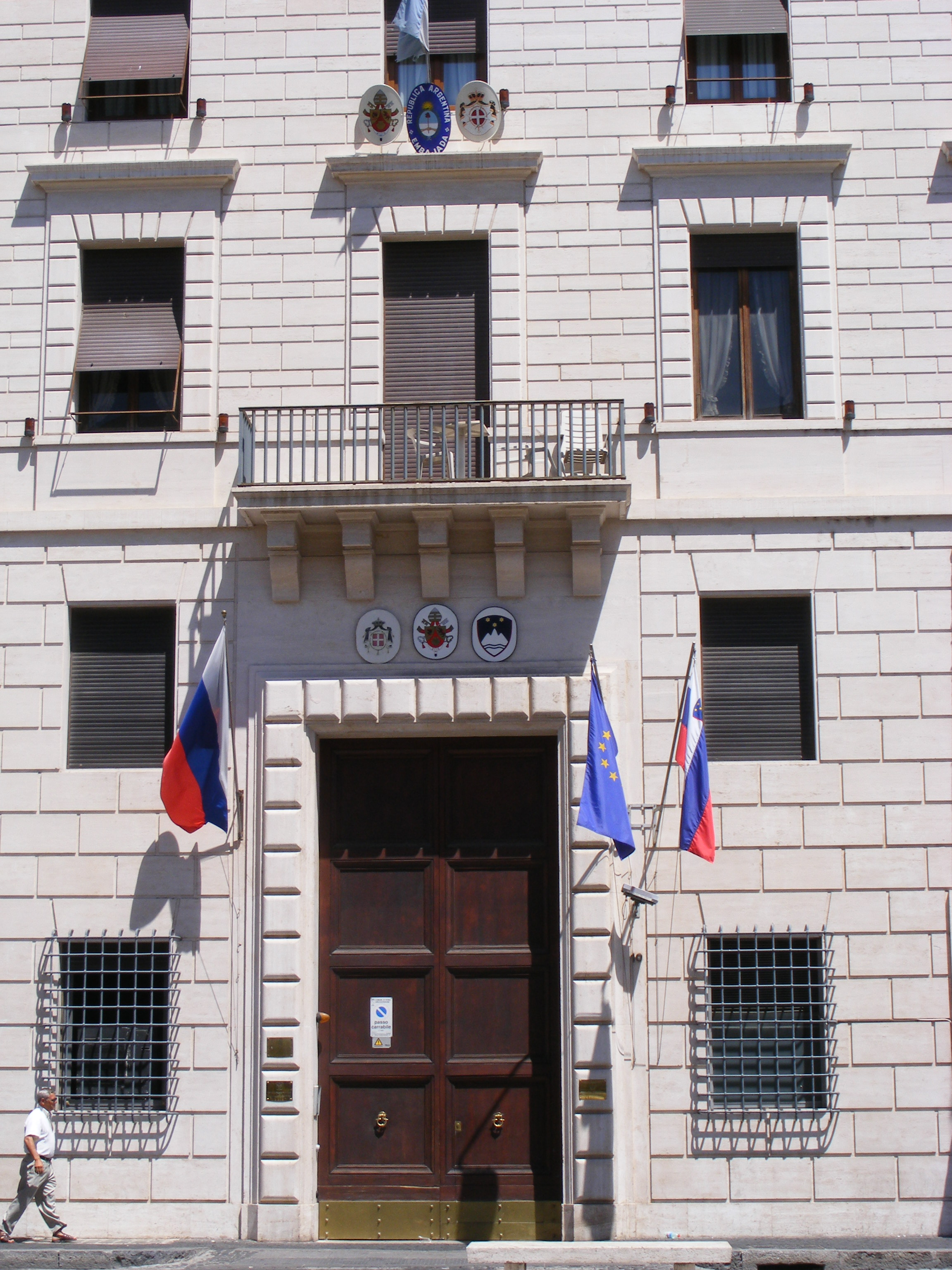
Building hosting the Embassy to the Holy See, in Rome

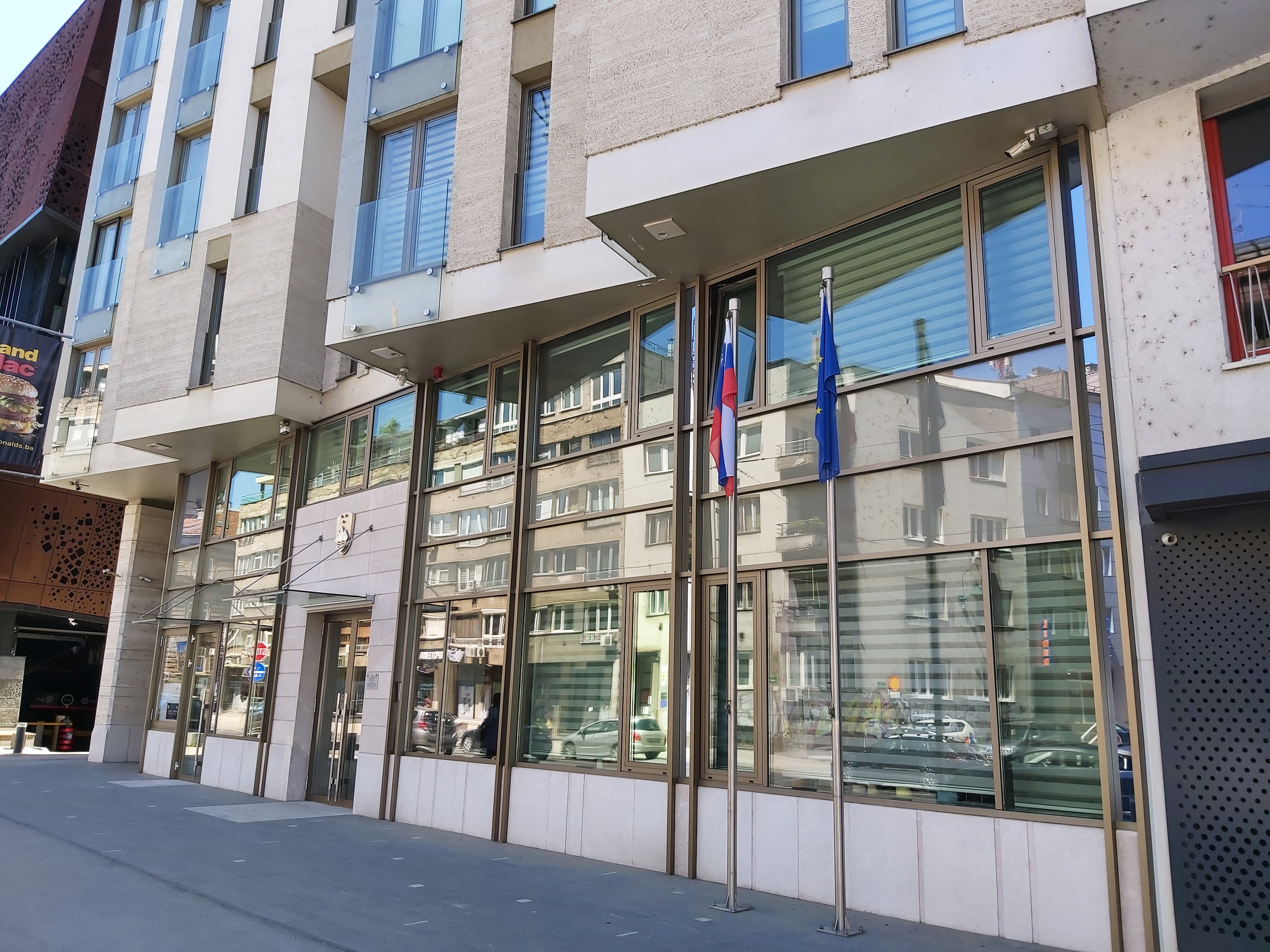
Embassy in Sarajevo

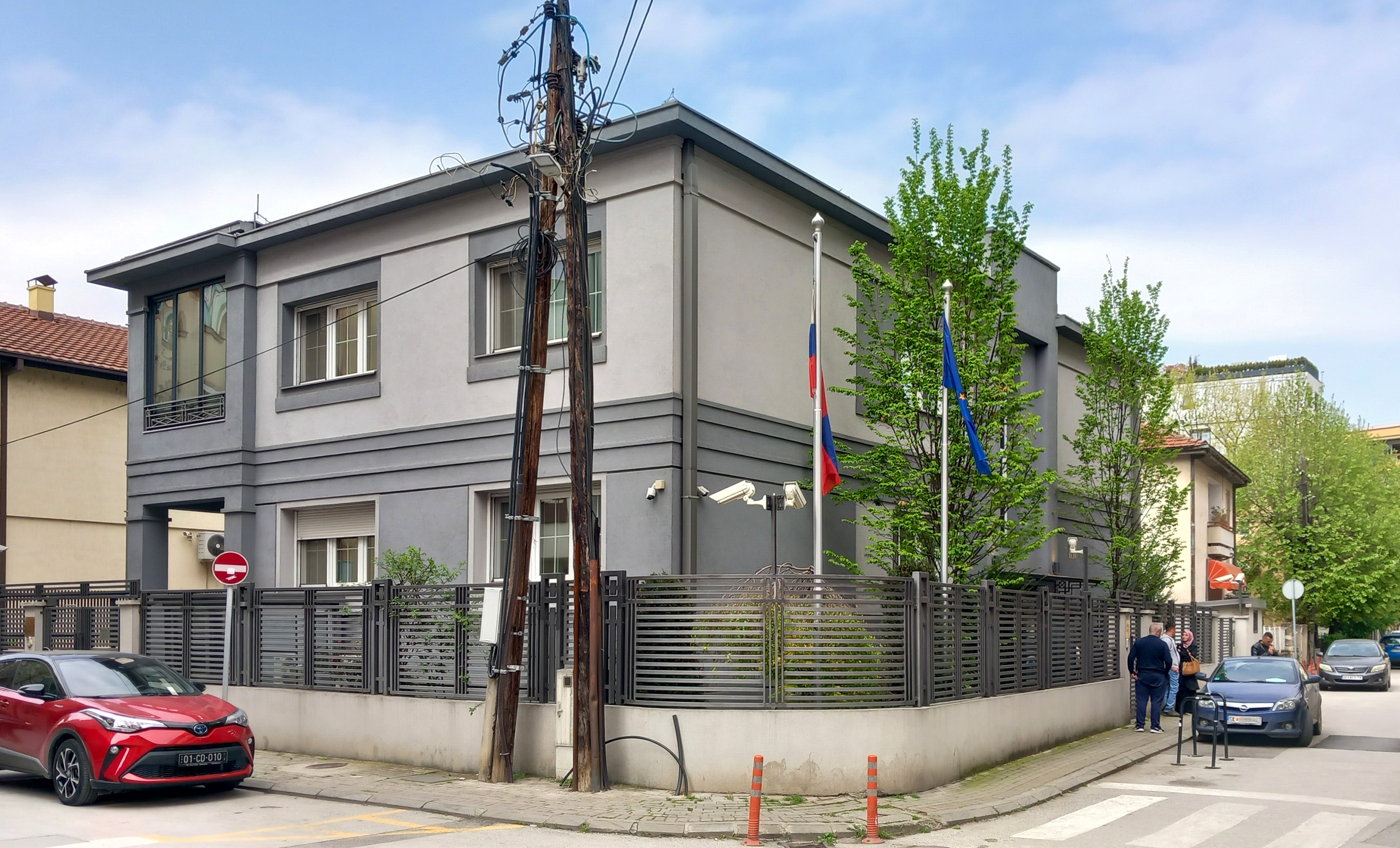
Embassy in Skopje

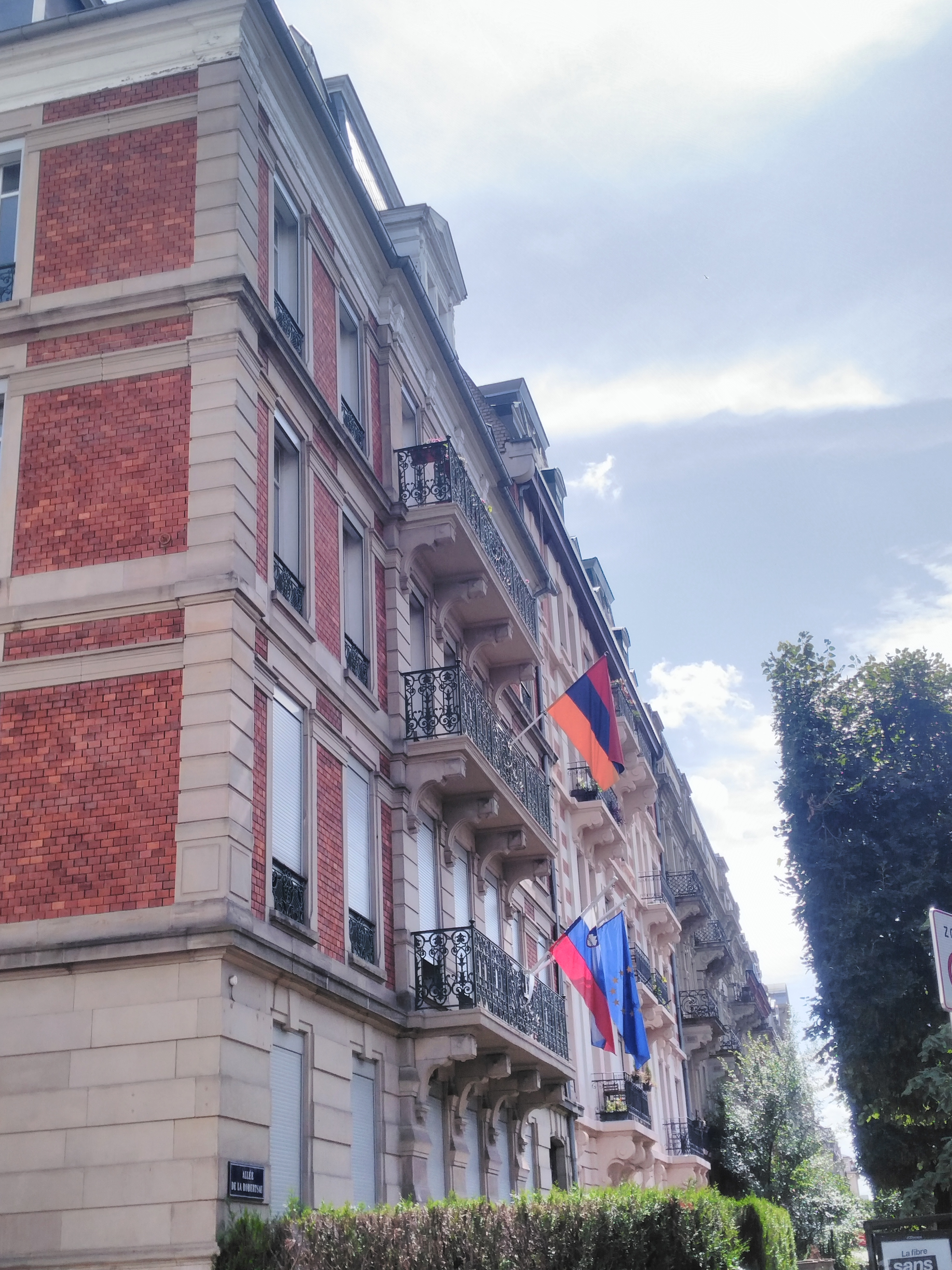
Permanent Mission to the Council of Europe in Strasbourg

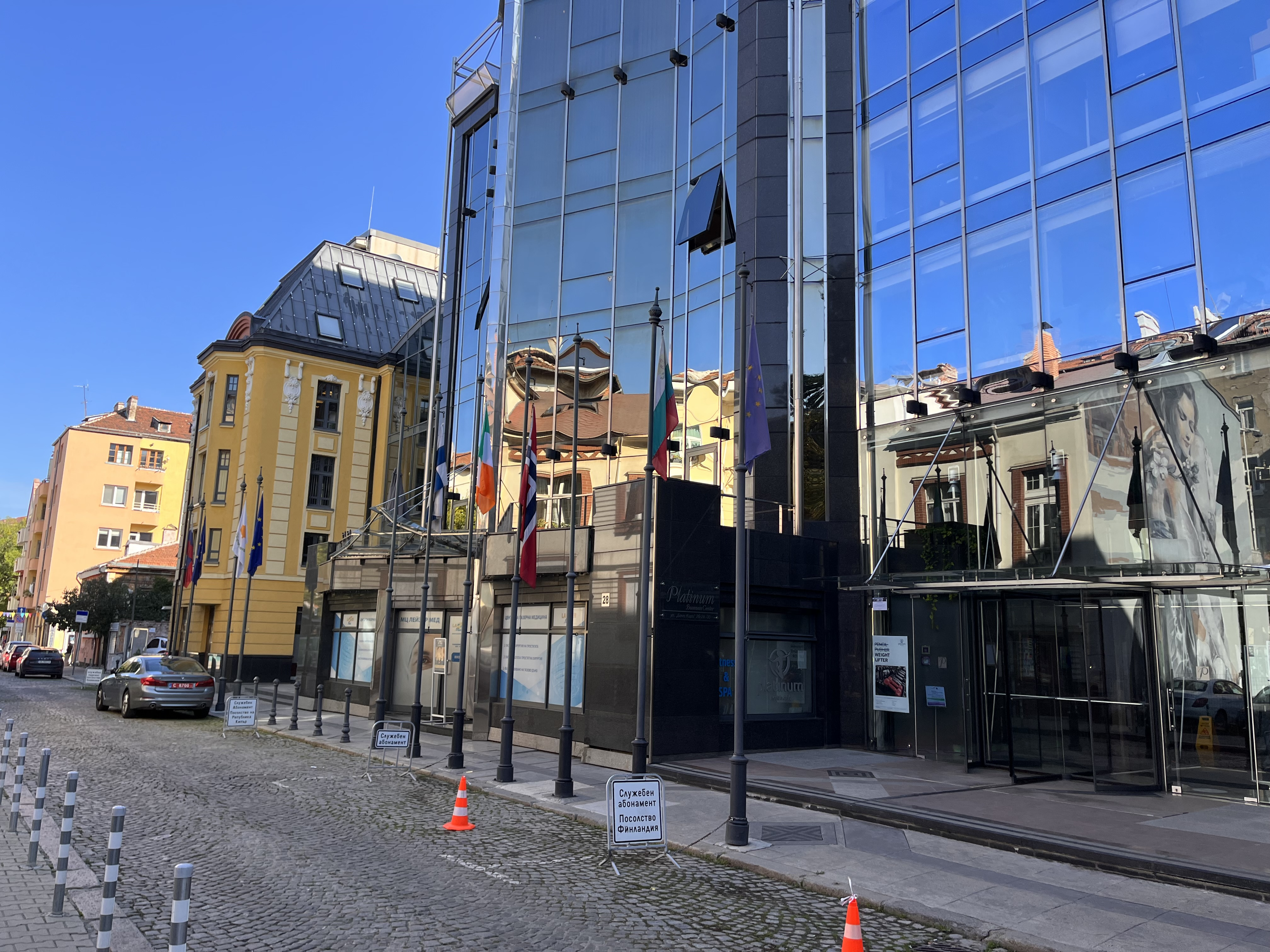
Embassy in Sofia

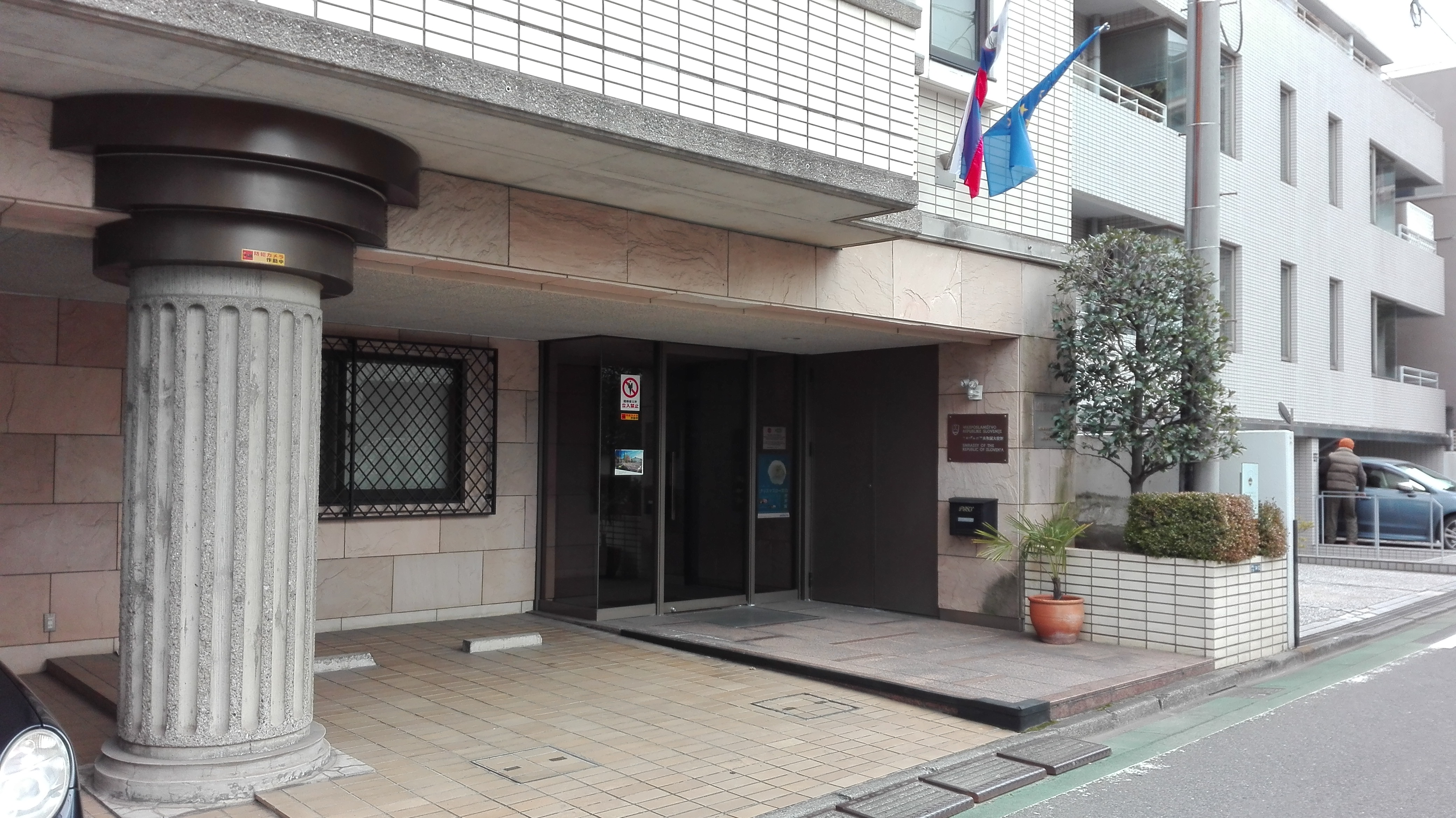
Embassy in Tokyo

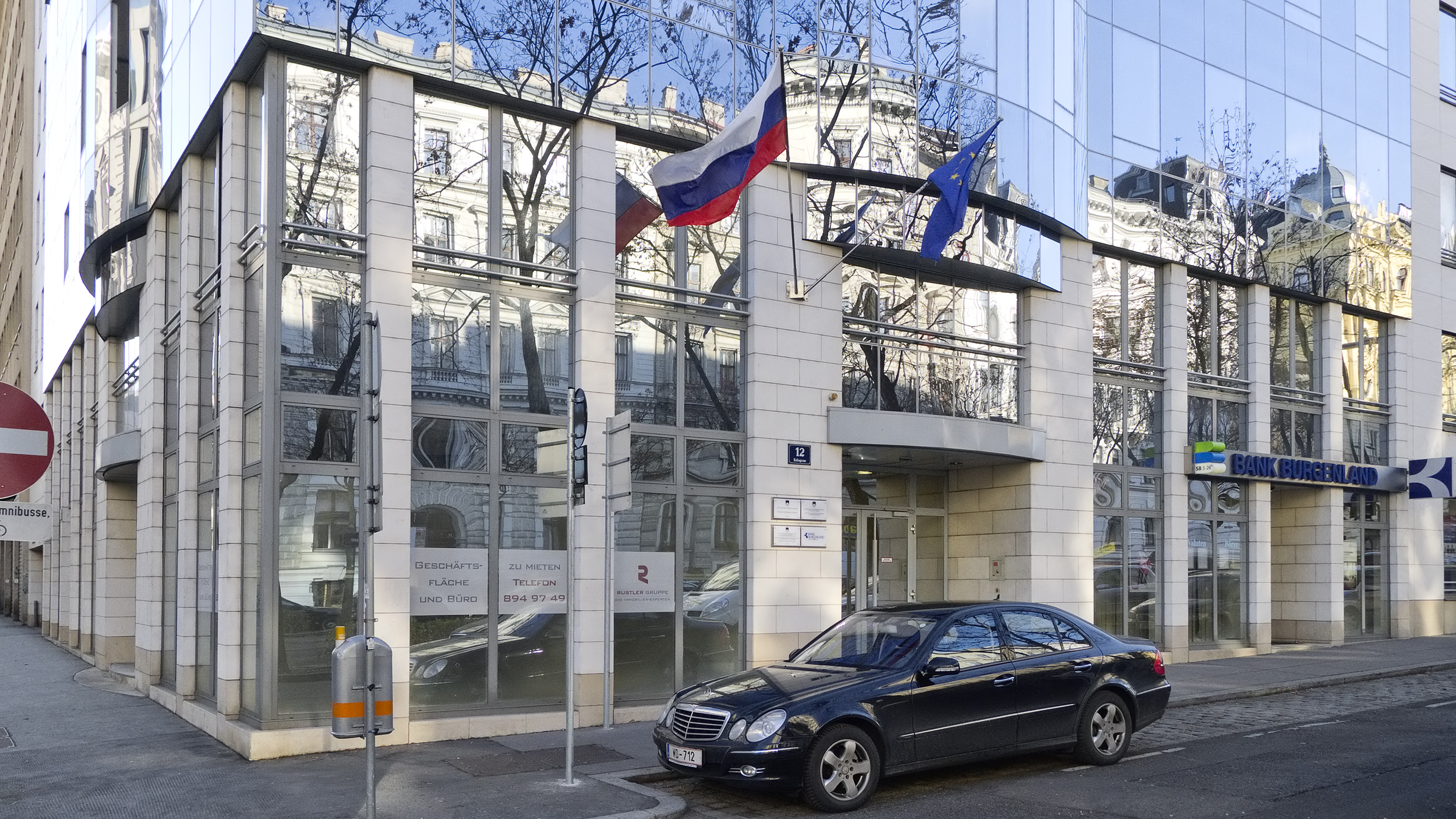
Embassy in Vienna

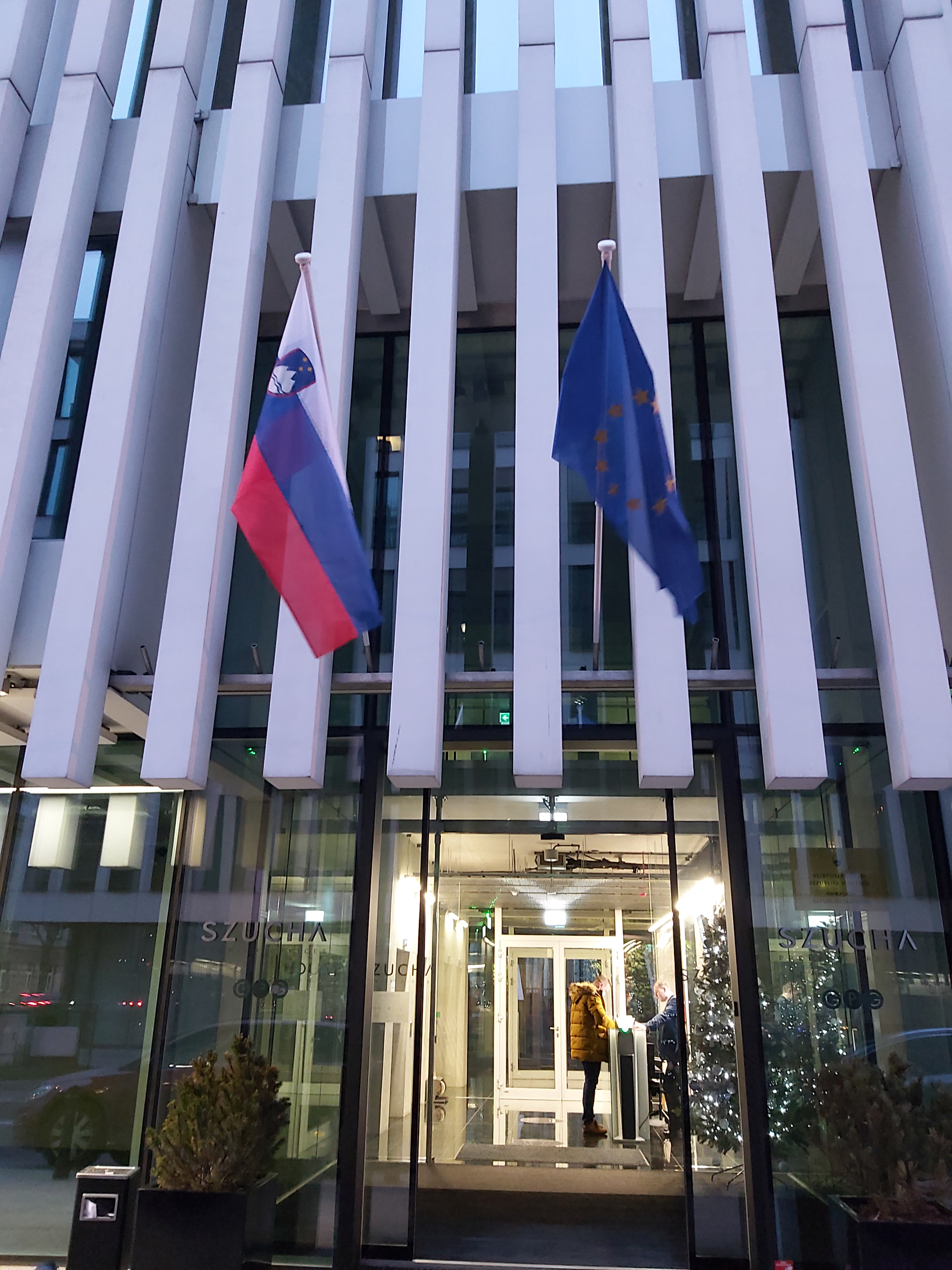
Building hosting the Embassy in Warsaw

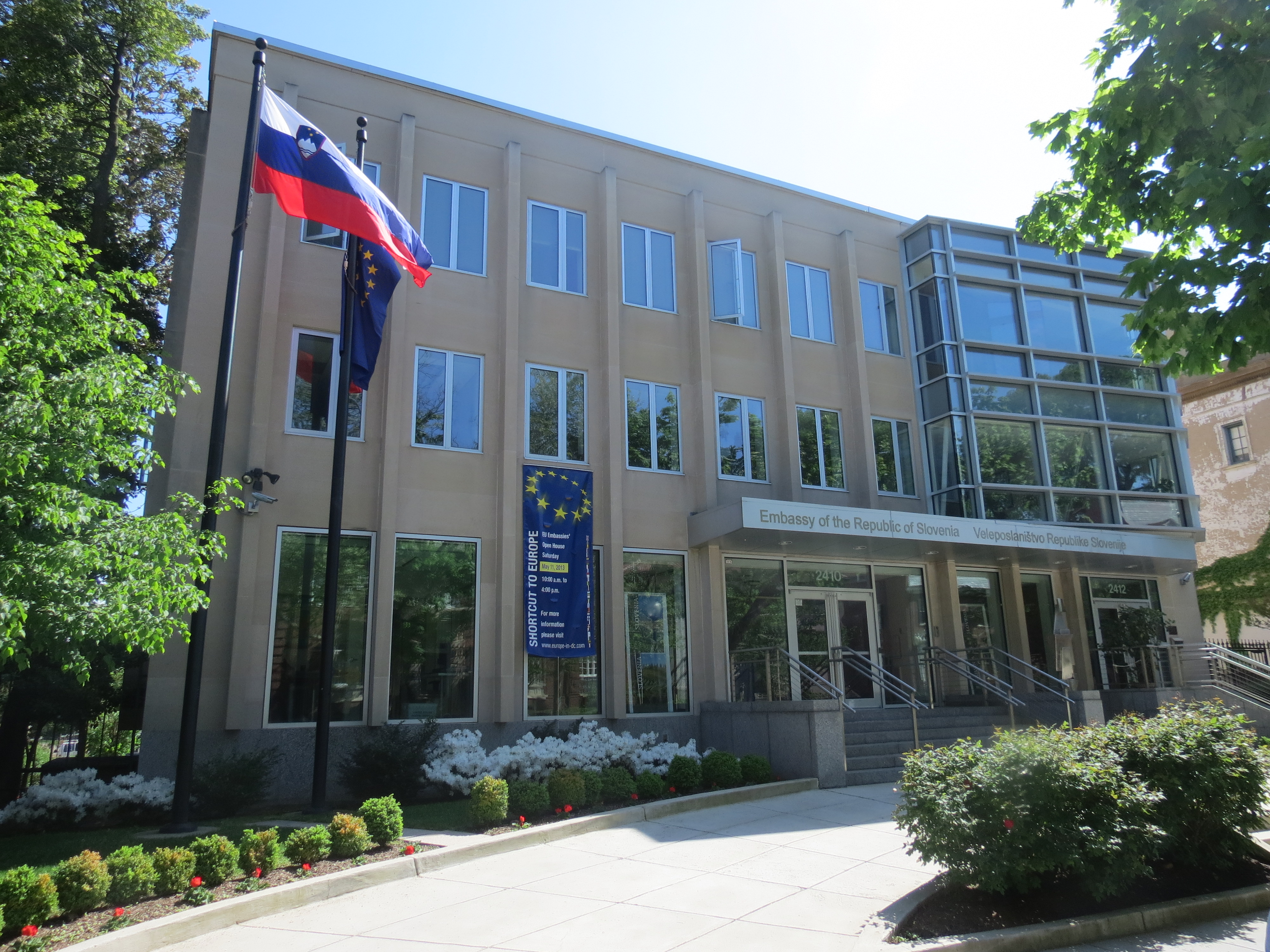
Embassy in Washington, D.C.

== Closed missions ==
=== Americas ===
Host country	Host city	Mission	Year closed	Ref.
United States	New York City	Consulate General	2012	

=== Europe ===
Host country	Host city	Mission	Year closed	Ref.
Finland	Helsinki	Embassy	2012	
Germany	Düsseldorf	Consulate	2012	
Portugal	Lisbon	Embassy (Note: Since the closure of this mission, relations with Portugal have been handled by an ambassador based at the Slovenian foreign ministry headquarters in Ljubliana)	2012	
Sweden	Stockholm	Embassy	2012	

== See also ==
- Foreign relations of Slovenia
- List of diplomatic missions in Slovenia
