= List of diplomatic missions in Slovenia =

This is a list of diplomatic missions resident in Slovenia. At present, the capital city of Ljubljana hosts 41 embassies. Several other countries have honorary consuls to provide emergency services to their citizens. Several other countries have non-resident embassies accredited from other regional capitals, such as Vienna, in Austria, and Rome, in Italy, for diplomatic and consular purposes.

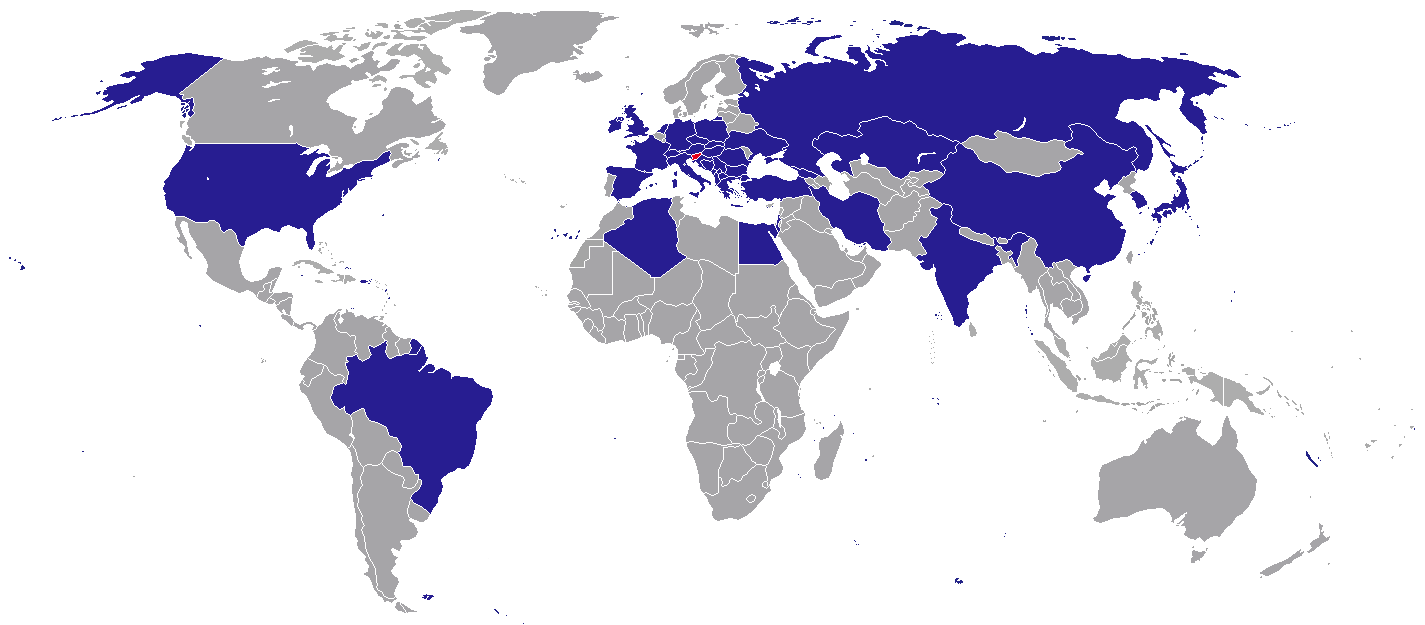
Map of diplomatic missions in Slovenia

== Diplomatic missions in Ljubljana ==
=== Embassies ===
1. Albania
2. Algeria
3. Austria
4. Bosnia and Herzegovina
5. Brazil
6. Bulgaria
7. China
8. Croatia
9. Czechia
10. Egypt
11. France
12. Georgia
13. Germany
14. Greece
15. Holy See
16. Hungary
17. India
18. Iran
19. Ireland
20. Israel
21. Italy
22. Japan
23. Kazakhstan
24. Kosovo
25. Morocco
26. Montenegro
27. Netherlands
28. North Macedonia
29. Poland
30. Romania
31. Russia
32. Serbia
33. Slovakia
34. South Korea
35. Sovereign Military Order of Malta
36. Spain
37. Switzerland
38. Turkey
39. Ukraine
40. United Kingdom
41. United States

=== Gallery ===
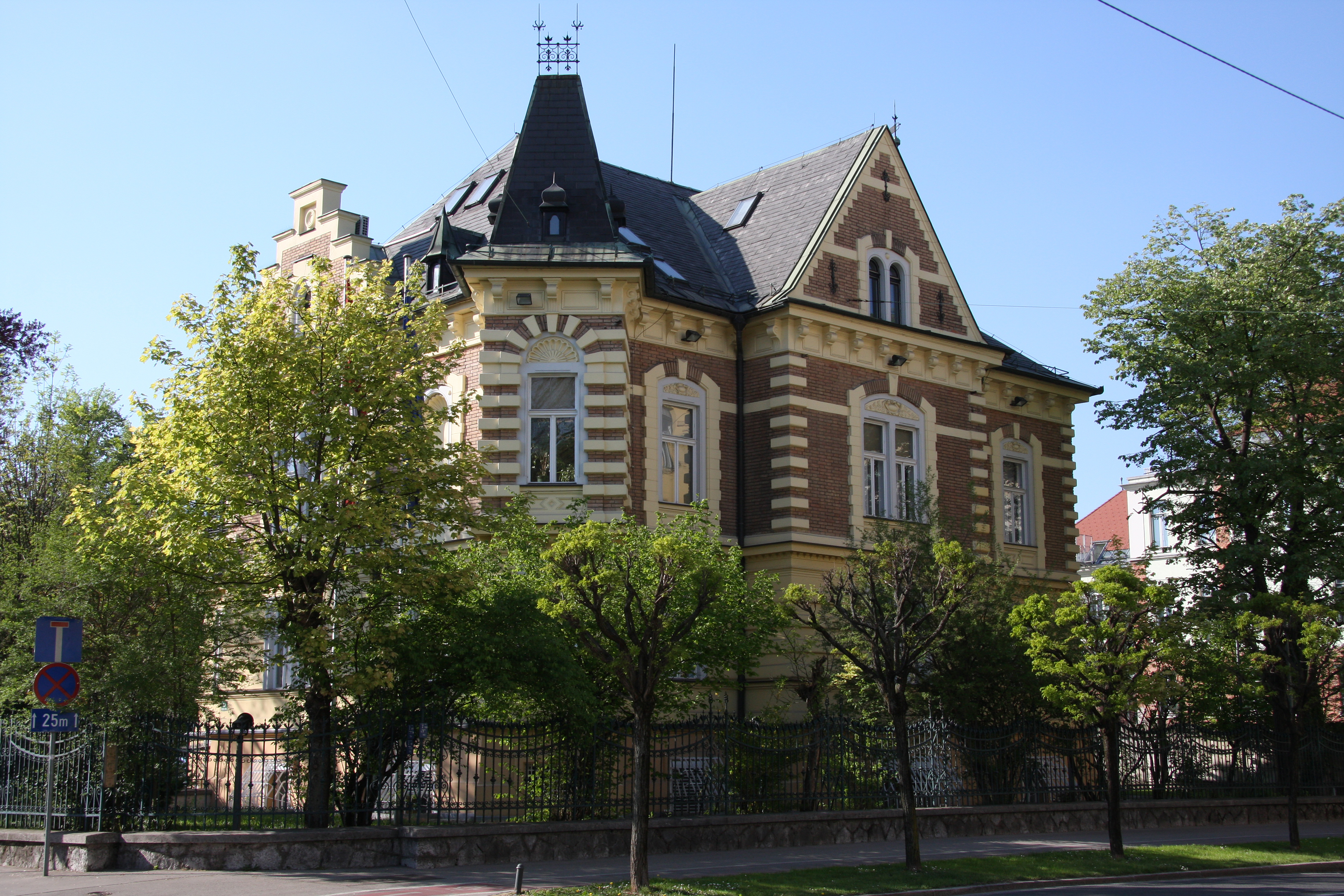
Embassy of Austria

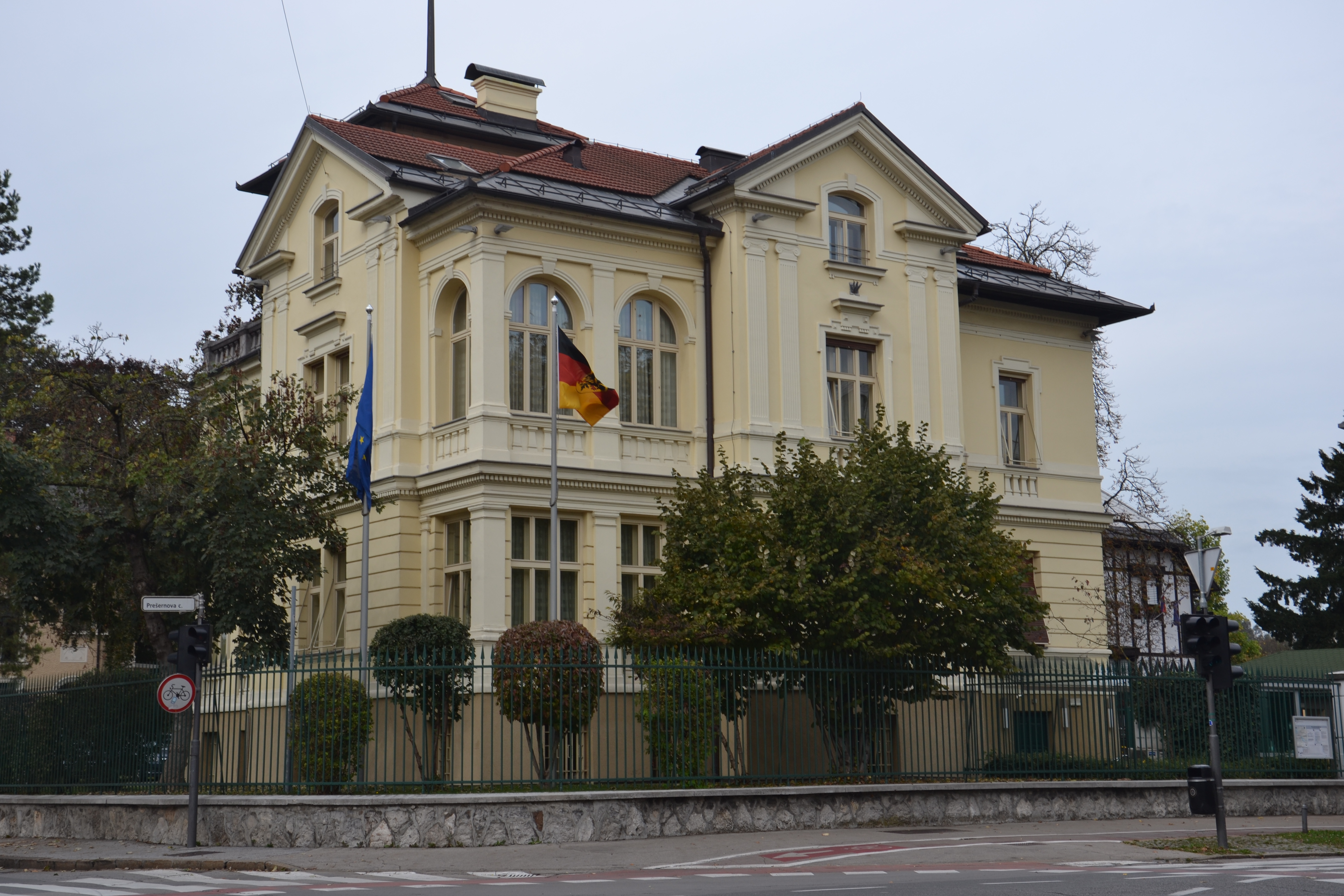
Embassy of Germany

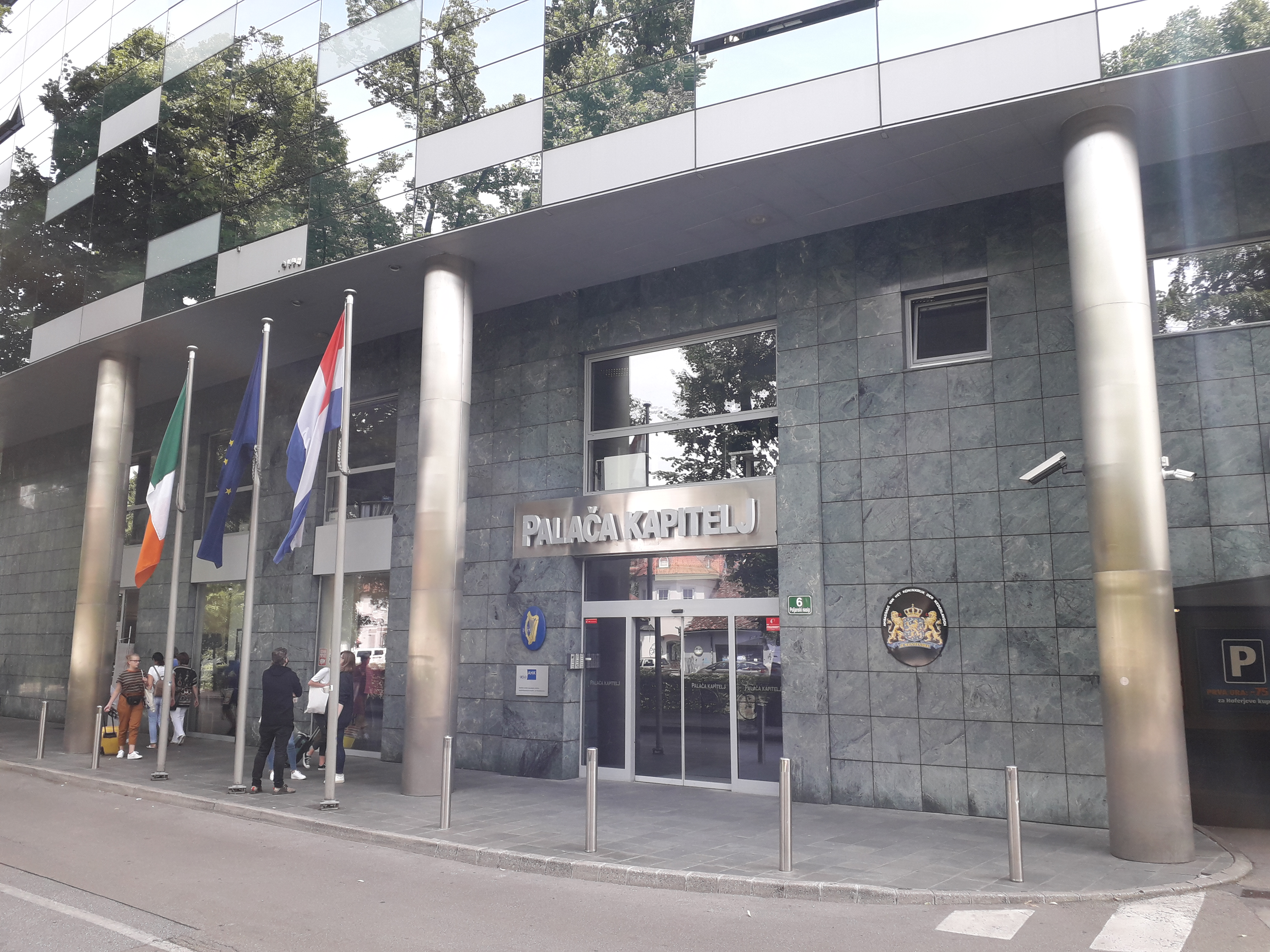
Building hosting the Embassies of Ireland and the Netherlands

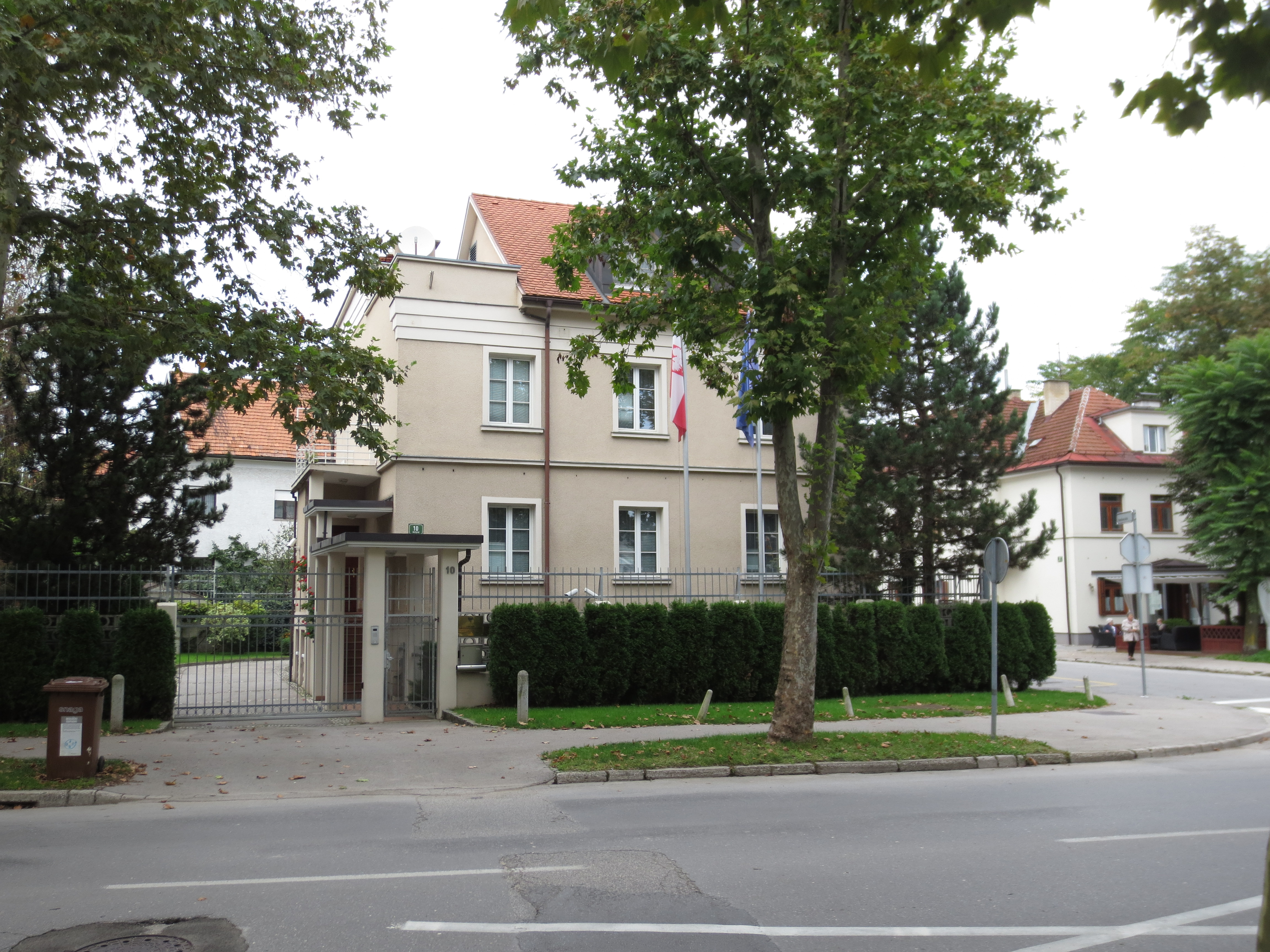
Embassy of Poland

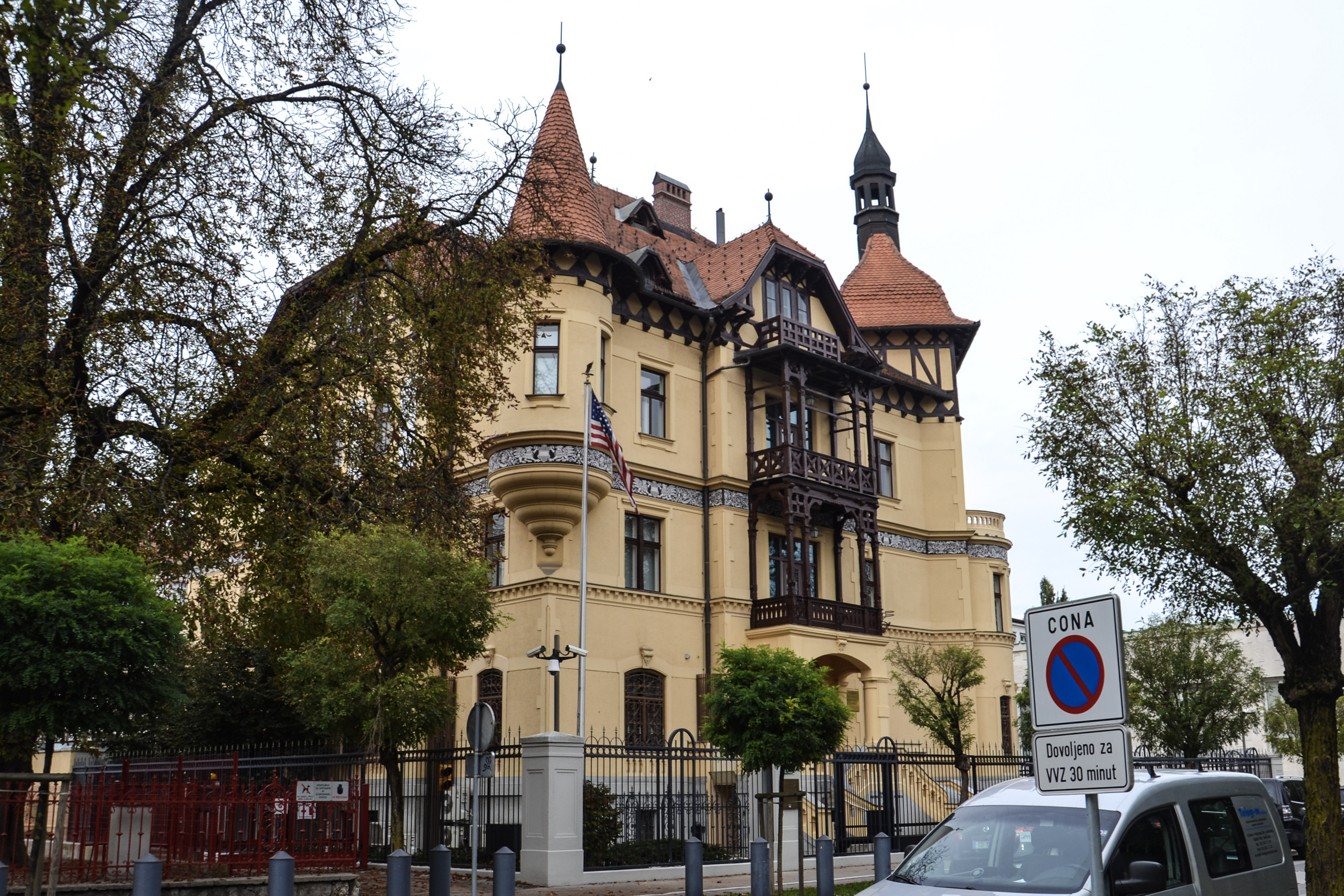
Embassy of United States

== Consular missions ==
The cities of Koper and Lendava are each host to career consulates-general.

=== Koper ===
1. Italy

=== Lendava ===
1. Hungary

== Non-resident embassies accredited to Slovenia ==
=== Resident in Berlin, Germany ===
1. Cambodia
2. Panama
3. Singapore
4. Togo
5. Zambia
6. Zimbabwe

=== Resident in Brussels, Belgium ===
1. Cape Verde
2. Gambia
3. San Marino
4. Seychelles

=== Resident in Budapest, Hungary ===
1. Canada
2. Denmark
3. Finland
4. Kyrgyzstan
5. Latvia
6. Malaysia
7. Moldova
8. Norway
9. Sweden
10. Uzbekistan

=== Resident in Prague, Czechia ===
1. Armenia
2. Colombia
3. Estonia

=== Resident in Rome, Italy ===
1. Bahrain
2. Burundi
3. Congo-Brazzaville
4. Ecuador
5. Equatorial Guinea
6. Ethiopia
7. Ghana
8. Guinea
9. Libya
10. Madagascar
11. Mauritania
12. Monaco
13. Nicaragua
14. Pakistan
15. Senegal
16. Tanzania
17. Uganda
18. Uruguay

=== Resident in Vienna, Austria ===
1. Afghanistan
2. Angola
3. Argentina
4. Australia
5. Azerbaijan
6. Bangladesh
7. Belarus
8. Belgium
9. Burkina Faso
10. Chile
11. Colombia
12. Costa Rica
13. Cuba
14. Cyprus
15. Dominican Republic
16. El Salvador
17. Guatemala
18. Indonesia
19. Iraq
20. Ivory Coast
21. Iceland
22. Jordan
23. Kenya
24. Kuwait
25. Laos
26. Lebanon
27. Lithuania
28. Luxembourg
29. Mexico
30. Mongolia
31. Namibia
32. Nepal
33. New Zealand
34. North Korea
35. Oman
36. Palestine
37. Paraguay
38. Peru
39. Philippines
40. Portugal
41. Qatar
42. Saudi Arabia
43. South Africa
44. Sri Lanka
45. Sudan
46. Syria
47. Thailand
48. Tunisia
49. United Arab Emirates
50. Venezuela
51. Vietnam
52. Yemen

=== Resident elsewhere ===
1. Andorra (Andorra la Vella)
2. Dominica (London)
3. Malta (Valletta)
4. Nigeria (Bucharest)
5. Rwanda (Geneva)
6. Turkmenistan (Moscow)

== Closed missions ==
- Latvia (Note: Resident in Budapest, Hungary)

Host city	Sending country	Mission	Year closed	Ref.
Ljubljana	Azerbaijan	Embassy office	Unknown	
Ljubljana	Belgium	Embassy	2015	
Ljubljana	Cyprus	Embassy	2013	
Ljubljana	Denmark	Embassy	2014	
Ljubljana	Finland	Embassy	2015	
Ljubljana	Lithuania	Embassy	2014	
Ljubljana	Norway	Embassy	2011	
Ljubljana	Portugal	Embassy	2013	
Ljubljana	Sweden	Embassy	2010	
Ljubljana	Venezuela	Embassy	Unknown	

== No relations ==
- Eswatini
- Lesotho

== See also ==
- Foreign relations of Slovenia
- List of diplomatic missions of Slovenia
