= Staffan de Mistura =

Italian-Swedish diplomat

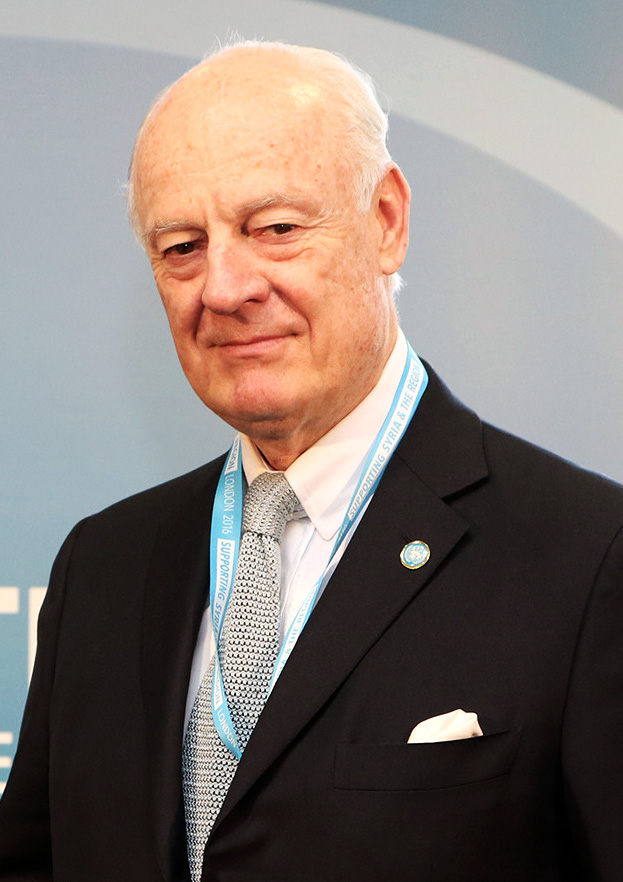
- Staffan de Mistura in 2016

United Nations Personal Envoy for Western Sahara
- Incumbent
- Assumed office 6 October 2021
- Secretary-General: António Guterres
- Preceded by: Horst Köhler

United Nations Special Envoy for Syria
- In office 31 May 2014 – 31 October 2018
- Secretary General: Ban Ki-moon (UN) (2014–2016); António Guterres (UN) (since 2017)
- Preceded by: Lakhdar Brahimi
- Succeeded by: Geir Otto Pedersen

Deputy Minister of Foreign Affairs and International Cooperation of Italy
- In office 27 March 2013 – 28 April 2013
- Prime Minister: Mario Monti
- Minister: Mario Monti (acting)

Under Secretary of State for Foreign Affairs and International Cooperation of Italy
- In office 29 November 2011 – 27 March 2013
- Prime Minister: Mario Monti
- Minister: Giulio Terzi di Sant'Agata

Special Representative for the United Nations Assistance Mission for Iraq
- In office 2007–2009
- Secretary-General: Ban Ki-moon
- Preceded by: Ashraf Qazi
- Succeeded by: Ad Melkert

Personal details
- Born: 25 January 1947 (age 79) Stockholm, Sweden
- Occupation: Diplomat

Staffan de Mistura (born 25 January 1947) is an Italian-Swedish diplomat, United Nations official and former member of the Italian government.

After a 40-year career in various United Nations agencies, he was appointed Undersecretary of State for Foreign Affairs and thereafter Deputy Foreign Minister in the Italian cabinet headed by Mario Monti. In 2013, he was director of operations at the Foundation Villa San Michele in Anacapri. From 2014 to 2019 he was the United Nations Special Envoy for Syria.

De Mistura's previous UN posts have included that of Special Representative of the Secretary-General in Iraq (2007–2009) and Afghanistan (2010–2011), Personal Representative of the Secretary-General for Southern Lebanon (2001–2004), and director of the UN Information Center in Rome (2000–2001). His work has taken him to many of the world's most volatile trouble-spots including Afghanistan, Iraq, Rwanda, Somalia, Sudan and the former Yugoslavia.

Since September 2019, De Mistura is Associate Professor at Sciences Po Paris School of International Affairs (PSIA) and he is a distinguished Senior Visiting Fellow at the Jackson Institute for Global Affairs at Yale University.

== Early life ==
Staffan de Mistura was born in 1947 in Stockholm, Sweden, the son of a Swedish mother, Birgitta Johnson de Mistura and an Italian father, Emil Domingo de Mistura. His father belonged to a noble Italian family of Šibenik (Italian: Sebenico) in Croatia, which fled after World War II, together with most Dalmatian Italians, after Tito's Communists took over the country.

He graduated at Sapienza University of Rome in political sciences.

Working as an intern for the UN World Food Programme (WFP) in Cyprus in the mid-1970s, he witnessed the death of a child, shot by a sniper. The child had wandered over the 'green line' dividing Cyprus and Turkish Republic of Northern Cyprus. This experience was something he found profoundly shocking, but it also stirred up a sense of 'constructive outrage' as he has described it; a desire to study humanitarian emergency relief and dedicate his life to working for the peaceful resolution of conflict.

== 1970s–1990s ==
In 1971, de Mistura started his career with the UN as a WFP Project Officer in Sudan. In 1973 he was an Emergency Relief Officer in Chad, there he led the first ever UN airdrop operation. By 1976, he was working as the UN Food and Agriculture Organization's Deputy Chef de Cabinet, a post he remained in until 1985. In addition, he was given special humanitarian assignments to Dubrovnik, Sarajevo, Sudan, Ethiopia, Vietnam and the Lao People's Democratic Republic.

In 1987, de Mistura returned to Sudan to become WFP Director of Operations. From 1988 to 1991, he acted as director of fund-raising and external relations of the United Nations Office of the Coordinator for Afghanistan. Moving on again, he was employed as director of the Division of Public Affairs of the United Nations Children's Fund, known as UNICEF, and was also UNICEF representative for Somalia.

In 1992, he was in Nagorno-Karabakh with UN mission chief Francesco Vendrell.

He was briefly the United Nations Humanitarian Coordinator for Iraq. The job lasted from March through August 1997.

De Mistura sat as a member of the Security Council Panel on Humanitarian Issues in Iraq, in 1999. He was also briefly Special Adviser to the High Commissioner for Refugees in Kosovo; a job that lasted from April to June. He was then given the task of Regional Administrator for the Mitrovica Region in Kosovo.

== 2000–2013 ==
In June 2000, de Mistura was Special Rapporteur during the Fribourg Forum on Regional Cooperation and Coordination in Crisis Management for Europe and the Newly Independent States. Until 2001, he was director of the United Nations Information Centre in Rome.

From 2001 to 2004, de Mistura served as Personal Representative of the Secretary-General Kofi Annan in Southern Lebanon. One of his major achievements in that post was to set up and organise a successful de-mining operation. He then went on to serve as Deputy Special Representative for Iraq for 15 months, starting in January 2005. During his tenure, he was keen to portray an optimistic view of Iraq and its chances of recovery, highlighting the hard work the UN were putting in behind the scenes to provide Iraqis with a better standard of living.

After that, he became director of the UN Staff College in Turin, Italy, a post he retained until 11 September 2007, when Ban Ki-moon appointed him as his Special Representative (SRSG) for Iraq. He was the successor of SRSG Ashraf Qazi and assumed his responsibilities in the Mission Area on 5 November and in Baghdad on 11 November 2007. In the weeks leading up to the appointment, it was reported that politicians in Baghdad strongly favoured a former Romanian envoy to Iraq, Radu Onofrei. However, it was later revealed through Wikileaks that it was the Romanian government that lobbied the US to favor Mr. Onofrei.

In July 2009, de Mistura left Iraq to become the deputy executive director for External Relations of the World Food Programme in Rome.

In January 2010, Richard Holbrooke, the U.S. special representative for Afghanistan and Pakistan, revealed that de Mistura had been offered the job as the U.N. special representative in Afghanistan, replacing Kai Eide. The New York Times noted in an editorial that UN Secretary General Ban Ki-moon had also been considering Jean-Marie Guéhenno of France and Ian Martin of Britain for the Kabul mission. By the end of January 2010, Ban announced his intention to appoint de Mistura in March 2010 as Special Representative of the Secretary General (SRSG) in Afghanistan and Chief of the United Nations Assistance Mission in Afghanistan (UNAMA).

While U.S. President Barack Obama laid the blame for the massacre of U.N. officials in Mazar-i-Sharif on the Afghans, de Mistura said "I don't think we should be blaming any Afghan. We should be blaming the person who produced the news—the one who burned the Koran."

On 28 November 2011, he was nominated Undersecretary of Foreign Affairs in Italy's technocratic cabinet headed by Mario Monti.

In May 2013, the Italian Government appointed him, then serving as deputy foreign minister, as the Special Envoy of the Prime Minister of Italy to resolve the case of two Italian Navy marines, held in India since February 2012, who were accused by the Indian authorities for allegedly killing by mistake two Indian fishermen, believing that they were pirates, when deployed on an Italian-flagged merchant vessel Enrica Lexie. The 2012 Italian Navy Marines shooting incident in the Laccadive Sea strained diplomatic relations between Italy and India. De Mistura has been mandated to find a "fair, positive and acceptable solution" with Indian judicial authorities to ensure a quick trial and return of Massimiliano Latorre and Salvatore Girone to Italy.

== UN Special Envoy for Syria ==
On 10 July 2014, the United Nations Secretary-General Ban Ki-moon announced that he had appointed de Mistura as the new special envoy tasked with seeking a peaceful resolution of the conflict in Syria.

One of de Mistura's strategies was to establish localised "freezes" that would be replicated elsewhere and, in combination with various humanitarian, administrative and political initiatives, transform the conflict and lay the basis for a new and improved political process. That strategy was later criticised by Mouin Rabbani a former staffer in de Mistura's office for being a "gimmick".

In October 2016, de Mistura offered to personally escort the rebels fighters if they were willing to leave Aleppo in order to avoid the continuing bombing over Eastern Aleppo where at least two hundred thousand civilians were caught in the middle of the battle. He added that otherwise, Aleppo would be completely destroyed within two months and thousands of civilians would be killed. Al-Nusra Front refused that offer and instead left Aleppo in December.

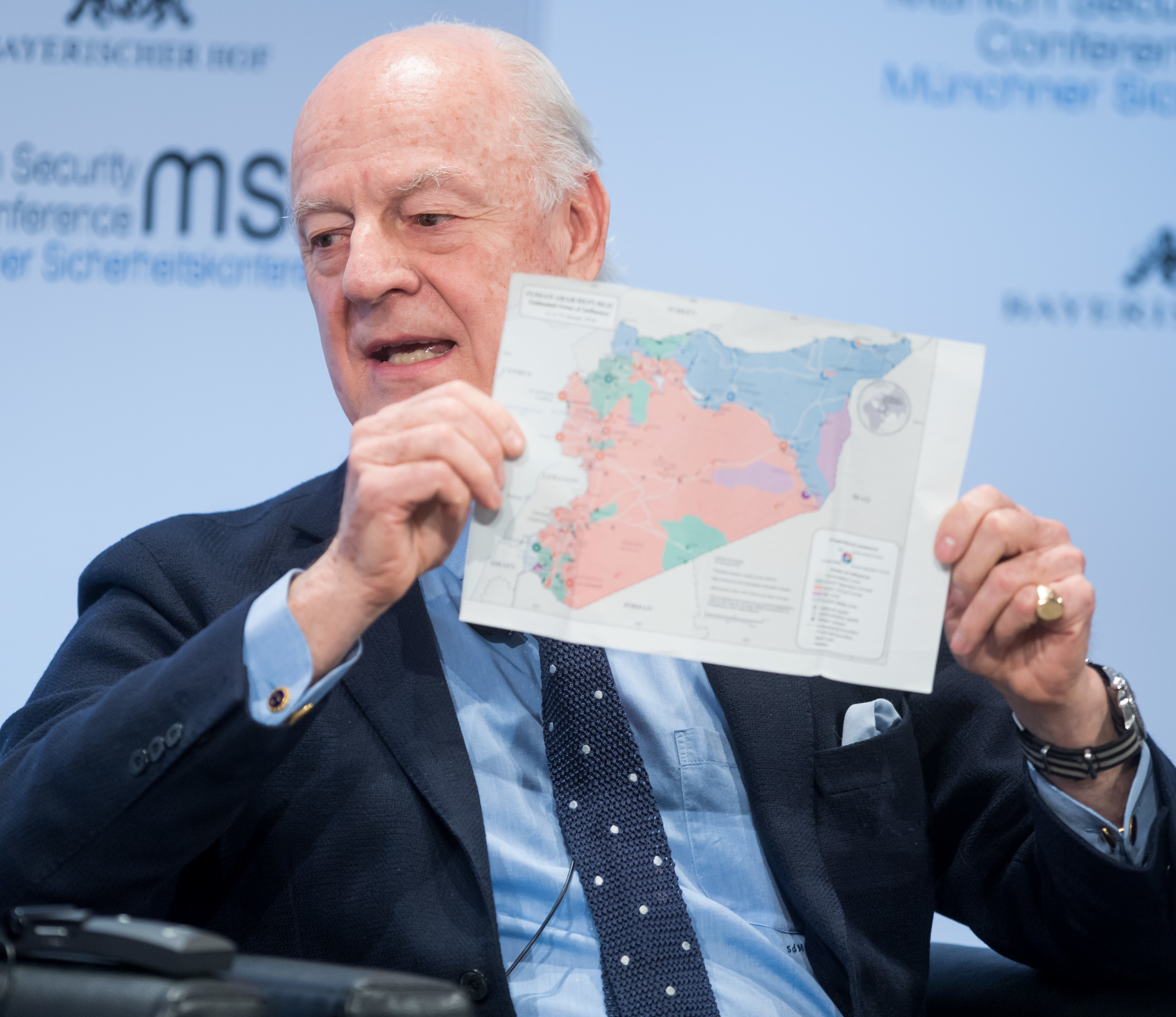
De Mistura holding a map of Syria during the 2018 Munich Security Conference

By 2018, de Mistura was the longest serving of three UN mediators – Kofi Annan and Lakhdar Brahimi – during the more-than-seven-year Syrian conflict. In October 2018, he announced that he would step down at the end of November for personal reasons.

In his last briefing to the Security Council, on 20 December 2018, Staffan de Mistura highlighted the various attempts made during the four and a half years of his mandate to move forward the political process. Although stating that the work undertaken by the UN "is no substitute for genuine efforts of influential countries to talk to each other and to work constructively", he claimed "I believe we have made some difference – but not enough", and listed the essential points to remember from the work carried out during his mandate, before passing it on to his successor:

- "We have saved lives with some ceasefires and de-escalations, no matter how limited in scope and time, but did save lives, and stimulated humanitarian access to places that were not getting it – but nowhere near what civilians desperately needed and asked for;
- We have convened the Government and opposition and also helped the process of uniting the opposition – but we have not yet, and we have to admit that, had the parties really recognize each other as interlocutors with whom they must do business and actually negotiate, let alone reach agreements;
- We have elaborated with the parties key principles for a common future and settlement – but we have not yet turned these yet into real mechanisms for implementation;
- We have identified a clear agenda accepted by the parties that would facilitate negotiation but we have not yet been able to tap into its potential;
- We have with determination promoted the involvement of Syrian women in the search for a peaceful settlement to the crisis – they know what their country is facing, they are more than half of the population – even though this is still constantly challenged; We have with equal determination promoted the meaningful inclusion and substantive participation of civil society – but this also is constantly challenged;
- We have nearly completed the work of putting in place a constitutional committee to draft a constitutional reform, as a contribution to the political process– but there is an extra mile to go;
- We know what is needed for a safe, calm, neutral environment in Syria – and for UN supervised elections to the highest international standards pursuant to a new reformed constitution – but we have not been able to begin the full work required to make that a reality."

In this last address, de Mistura updated the Council on the challenges that remained and once again urged the Security Council to remain united in support of UN efforts, and to support his successor, Geir Pedersen: "we need a renewed sense of common purpose and concerted action in this Council if 2019 is to be the real turning point for Syria", ending his speech as follows: "It is this Council - and this Council alone - which is responsible for the maintenance of international peace and security".

== UN Personal Envoy for Western Sahara ==
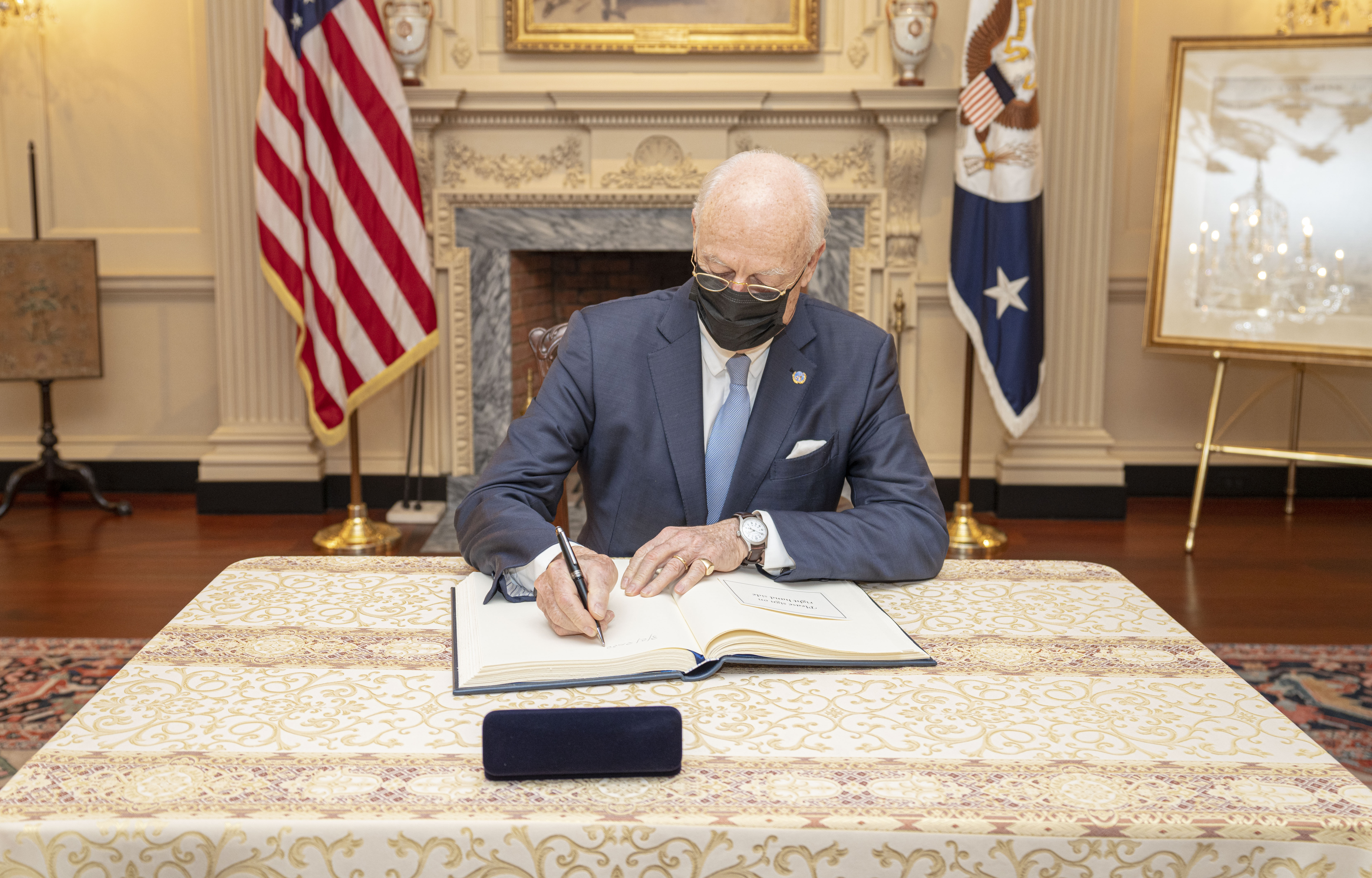
De Mistura in 2022

In late 2021, de Mistura was appointed as the UN personal envoy to Western Sahara.

== Honours and awards ==
Honours

Prince Carl Medal (2017)

Knight Grand Cross Order of Merit of the Italian Republic (2014)

Commander French Legion of Honour (2012)

Grand Officer Order of Merit of the Italian Republic (2007)

Commander Order of Merit of the Italian Republic (2004)

Awards

- 2016 : Dag Hammarskjöld Medal of Honor
- 2016 : Honorary Polish Prize of Sérgio Vieira de Mello
- 2016 : International Swede of the Year
- 1991 : Premio Airone d'oro for the Protection of Nature and Human Rights

Honorary degrees

- John Cabot University, honoris causa (2021)
- UCLouvain, honoris causa (2013)
- University of Turin, honoris causa (2007)

== Academic activities ==
- Associate Professor at Sciences Po Paris - Course on International Negotiations (2019)
- Senior Visiting Fellow at the Jackson Institute for Global Affairs, Yale University (2019)
- Joseph S. Nye, Jr. International Affairs lecturer at the Woodrow Wilson School, Princeton University (2019)
- Visiting Professor at Luiss University, Roma (2000)

== Other activities ==
- Peace and Sport, Advisor to the President (since 2021)
- Trilateral Commission, Member of the European Group (since 2020)
- Interpeace, Member of the Governing Board (since 2019)
- Paris School of International Affairs (PSIA), Member of the Strategic Committee (since 2019)
- Berghof Foundation, Member of the Advisory Council
- European Institute of Peace (EIP), President of the Board of Governors (2014-2016)

== Personal life ==
A dual citizen of Italy and Sweden, Staffan de Mistura holds the Italian title of marchese (marquess) and speaks Swedish, Italian, English, French, German, Spanish and Arabic (colloquial). He is married and has two daughters from a previous marriage.

== References and notes ==
Diplomatic posts
Preceded by Lakhdar Brahimi	United Nations and Arab League Envoy to Syria; 2014–2019	Succeeded by Geir Otto Pedersen
Preceded by Ashraf Qazi	UN Special Envoy to Iraq; 2007–2009	Succeeded by Ad Melkert
Non-profit organization positions
Preceded by Maria Pia Garavaglia	Extraordinary Commissioner of the Italian Red Cross; 2002–2002	Succeeded by Maurizio Scelli
