= Italy–Palestine relations =

- Italy: Palestine

Italy has yet to recognize Palestine as a sovereign state. Nevertheless, Italy backs the creation of the State of Palestine. Both nations are a part of the Union for the Mediterranean.

Italy has a consulate general in East Jerusalem, and the State of Palestine has an embassy in Rome.

== History ==
The first contact between Italy and the Palestine Liberation Organization (PLO) began in the 1960s. The Italian government was one of the first Western governments to establish relations with the PLO. Since then, Italy has been a strong supporter of the Palestinian people and their right to self-determination. The relations between Italy and Palestine are based on economic, tourism, security, and education cooperation. For instance, Italy provides development assistance to the Palestinian Authority in order to help it build infrastructure and create jobs. In addition, Italy is a major tourist destination for Palestinians, and the two countries have worked together to improve security in the region. Finally, Italy has also provided scholarships for Palestinian students to study in Italian universities. It also helps to fund UNRWA, which assists Palestinian refugees.

In 2013, Italian Prime Minister Enrico Letta visited the Palestinian territories as part of a larger tour of the Middle East; Letta's visit was seen by analysts as an effort to promote peace in the region and to strengthen ties between Italy and the Palestinians. However, others noted how the Letta cabinet also kept making efforts to consolidate relations with Israel, while maintaining a cautious approach in various debates regarding the Israeli–Palestinian conflict, in line with previous cabinets.

On 27 February 2015, a non-binding motion supporting the recognition of a Palestinian State as soon as the latter democratized, presented by Prime Minister Matteo Renzi and the Democratic Party, was passed by the Chamber of Deputies of the Italian Parliament, with 300 votes in favor and 45 against. At the same time, the Chamber of Deputies approved another motion, presented by New Centre-Right and other parties, with 237 votes in favor and 84 against; it called for a "timely return to direct negotiations between Israelis and Palestinians", in order to fulfill the Oslo Agreement, and subordinated the recognition of Palestine as a state to "a political agreement between Al-Fatah and Hamas [...] through the recognition of the State Of Israel and the abandonment of violence". A third motion explicitly calling for the full and formal recognition of the Palestinian State, presented by Left Ecology Freedom and the Five Star Movement, was rejected by the same house, with 56 votes in favor and 317 against.

As of 2022, Italy donated a total amount of €14 million to the UNRWA, a UN agency that supports Palestinian refugees, seven million of which were invested in the program's main services. In June 2023, the Italian government supported the UNRWA with an additional €1 million-worth donation. However, following the October 7 attacks the same year, the Italian government suspended its funding to the UNRWA; the decision was kept undisclosed until 27 January 2024, when Minister of Foreign Affairs Antonio Tajani publicly confirmed it, after several other EU and international countries also decided to temporarily stop their funding over a series of allegations made by Israel against the agency, including that a number of its Gaza Strip staff had been involved in the Hamas-led attack. On 25 May 2024, following a meeting between Tajani and Palestinian Prime Minister Mohammad Mustafa at the Palazzo della Farnesina in Rome, the former announced that Italy would restore its financial support to the UNRWA in a press statement, albeit under the condition that "not even a penny risks ending up supporting terrorism". According to Tajani, the Italian government approved a €35 million recovery package for the Palestinian population, five of which would be allocated to the UNRWA, with the remaining €30 million being assigned to the Food for Gaza initiative, in collaboration with the FAO, the PAM and the Red Crescent.

On 27 October 2023, Italy abstained from voting on an UN General Assembly resolution calling for an immediate ceasefire in the Gaza war, before taking the same stance on a similar resolution on 12 December of the same year. However, on 25 January 2024, the Democratic Party and its secretary, Elly Schlein, presented a non-binding motion urging the government to "sustain every initiative aimed to call for an immediate humanitarian ceasefire" in the war; following the addition of several amendments and two phone calls between Schlein and Prime Minister Giorgia Meloni, the resolution was approved by the Chamber of Deputies, with MPs from the right-wing parties supporting the Meloni cabinet abstaining from voting.

On 10 May 2024, Italy abstained from voting on another UN General Assembly resolution which upgraded Palestine's rights in the United Nations as an Observer State; the Italian Permanent Representative to the United Nations, Maurizio Massari, explained the decision by stating that Italy "shared the goal of global and long-standing peace that could only be reached through a two-state solution", but believed that the aforementioned agreement "should be reached via direct negotiations between the [two] sides".

On 20 February 2025, a proposal by the Five Star Movement that promoted the recognition of the State of Palestine by Italy was rejected by the Italian senate with 80 votes against.

In March 2025, Italy supported the Arab plans for a rebuilding of Gaza. In April 2025, three major Italian parties — the Democratic Party (Partito Democratico), the Five Star Movement (Movimento 5 Stelle), and the Greens and Left Alliance (Alleanza Verdi e Sinistra) — submitted a parliamentary motion calling for the recognition of the State of Palestine. The leader of the Democratic Party, Elly Schlein, and the former Prime Minister and leader of the Five Star Movement, Giuseppe Conte, described the situation in Gaza as a “massacre” and a “heinous crime against humanity,” arguing that Italy and Europe could not remain silent.

In February 2026, the Tuscany Region asked the national government to extend recognition to the State of Palestine, becoming the first region to undertake this official action. On 24 June 2026, the Legislative Assembly of Emilia-Romagna joined this demand with the support of the center-left majority, in addition to calling for Italy’s withdrawal from the Washington-led Board of Peace.

On 28–29 July 2026, Italy hosted a meeting of the Global Alliance for the Implementation of the Two-State Solution in Rome. The high-level segment was co-chaired by Italian Foreign Minister Antonio Tajani and Saudi Foreign Minister Faisal bin Farhan Al Saud, with the participation of Palestinian Minister of State for Foreign Affairs and Expatriates Varsen Aghabekian. The meeting brought together delegations from several countries and international organizations, as well as representatives of Palestine and the United Nations. Following the meeting, Italy and Saudi Arabia reaffirmed their support for a two-state solution, condemned escalating settler violence in the West Bank, and expressed opposition to the annexation of the territory and the forced displacement of Palestinians.

== See also ==
- Foreign relations of Italy
- Foreign relations of Palestine
