= Luca Poma =

Italian journalist (born 1972)

- Born: 16 February 1972 (age 54); Turin, Piedmont, Italy
- Occupations: Journalist, professor, writer, and political adviser

Luca Poma (Turin, 16 February 1972) is an Italian journalist, university professor, writer, and political adviser, having served as an adviser to the Italian Minister of Foreign Affairs Giulio Terzi di Sant'Agata.

== Biography ==
Poma began his career in 1990. In 1994, he was appointed as a member of the Regional Youth Committee. In 1995 he was the press officer for Amnesty International for northwest Italy. In 2012, during the Sixteenth Legislative period, he was the adviser to the Foreign Minister Giulio Terzi di Sant'Agata, a role he has kept even after the Minister's resignation in 2013. He worked alongside the diplomat Giulio Terzi di Sant'Agata in delivering initiatives on human rights, on climate change, COVID-19 pandemic intervention, and on the rule of law.

In 2013, he published Caro Ministro (Dear Minister), published by the Ministry of Foreign Affairs in Rome. The book included a detailed interview of foreign minister Giulio Terzi di Sant'Agata. The book retraced a full year of Italian foreign politics under Terzi.

In 2016, he became teacher of a department at LUMSA, where he teaches at the first chair in reputation management established in Italy. In 2017, he became a department chairman at the University of Bologna and at the University of the Republic of San Marino. He also lectured on Health Systems and Traditional Medicine at the University of Milano-Bicocca.

Poma was also present in the "red zone" during the Notre-Dame de Paris fire on 15 April 2019.

As a journalist, Poma has contributed to news publications and organizations such as Linkiesta, Sky TG24, Ferpi News, Coach Magazine, and Etica News.

== Controversies relating to Scientology ==
By his own admission, Poma attended the Church of Scientology in the 1990s. However, he later dissociated himself with an open letter with which he criticised the actions of the organization, giving interviews on national media about his public dissociation with the Church of Scientology. Later, Poma alleged that he had been the target of smear tactics, denouncing harassment against him by anonymous people.

== Publications ==
- Federico Bianchi di Castelbianco and Luca Poma, Giù le mani dai bambini: iperattività, depressione ed altre moderne malattie, Rome, Edizioni Scientifiche Magi, 2007, ISBN 88-7487-208-9.
- Cristian Carrara and Luca Poma, Giovani politica futuro, Brescia, Editrice La Scuola, 2010, ISBN 978-88-350-2474-3.
- Luca Poma, Creatori di futuro, Rome, Edizioni Scientifiche Magi, 2010, ISBN 978-88-7487-034-9.
- Luca Poma, Obiettivo Terra, Rome, Magi Edizioni, 2010, ISBN 978-88-7487-056-1.
- Luca Poma, Obiettivo Terra vol.2, Rome, Magi Edizioni, 2011, ISBN 978-88-7487-081-3.
- Luca Poma, Alberto Crapanzano, Marila Sarduy, Il Cubano che parla con gli occhi. Cuba attraverso gli scatti di Alex Castro – Foto, impressioni e racconti di vita, Rome, Magi Edizioni,2011, ISBN 978-88-7487-077-6.
- Luca Poma and Giampiero Vecchiato, Crisis Management: la Guida del Sole 24 Ore alla comunicazione di crisi, Milan, Edizioni Il Sole 24 Ore, 2012, ISBN 978-88-6345-368-3.
- Pier Mario Brava, Ervin Laszlo, Il senso ritrovato, Berlino, Springer International Publisher Science, 2012, ISBN 978-88-470-2831-9, Chapter edited by Luca Poma.
- Luca Poma, Two lives, one destiny, Rome, Edizioni Scientifiche Magi, 2012, ISBN 978-88-7487-304-3.
- Luca Poma, Caro Ministro, Rome, Ministero degli Affari Esteri, 2013.
- Stefano Martello e Biagio Oppi, Disastri naturali: una comunicazione responsabile? Modelli, casi reali e opportunità nella comunicazione di crisi, Bologna, Bononia University Press, 2016, ISBN 978-88-917-2867-8, Chapter edited by Luca Poma.
- Luca Poma, Il sex appeal dei Corpi Digitali, Milan, Franco Angeli Editore, 2016, ISBN 978-88-917-2867-8.
- Luca Poma, Salviamo Gian Burrasca, Florence, Terra Nuova Edizioni, ISBN 9788866812753.
- Luca Poma, Apri la tua mente. Pensiero circolare e nuovi percorsi all'interno delle organizzazioni sociali complesse, Padua, Edizioni Libreria Universitaria, ISBN 8833591980.
- Patrick Trancu, Lo stato in crisi - Pandemia, caos e domande per il futuro, Milan, 2021, Franco Angeli editore, ISBN 9788835110903, Chapter edited by Luca Poma.
- VV.AA, L'inclusione scolastica in Italia. Percorsi, riflessioni e prospettive future, Trento 2021, Centro Studi Erickson, ISBN 9788859025337, Chapter edited by Luca Poma.
- VV.AA, Governare le crisi per il rilancio aziendale. Lezioni manageriali e il caso Veneto. Venice 2021, Marsilio, ISBN 9788829707379. Chapter edited by Luca Poma.
- Luca Poma and Giorgia Grandoni, Il Reputation Management spiegato semplice, Turin 2021, Celid Edizioni, ISBN 978-88-6789-2273.
- Luca Poma and Arturo di Corinto, #Cryptomania. Tra token e blockchain viaggio nell'economia immateriale. Milan 2021, Hoepli, ISBN 9788836003211.
- Luca Poma, Giorgia Grandoni and Luca "Yuri" Toselli, #Influencer Come nascono i miti del web, Bologna 2021, Fausto Lupetti Editore, ISBN 978-88-8391-437-9.
- Poma L., Grandoni G.; MATERIALI DI RICERCA & DISCUSSIONE OIBR #1: “Rendicontazione di sostenibilità e valutazione delle performance ESG – Un’indagine sull’applicazione di standard e normative da parte delle aziende“, O.I.B.R. – Organismo Italiano Business Reporting, Maggio 2024. ISBN 9791221082951.
- Poma L., Grandoni G., Garzina, A; CRASH REPUTATION: 50 + 1 casi di crisi reputazionali: da Armani a DAZN, da Nike a Ryanair, gli errori che hanno pregiudicato il valore di aziende e influencer, Engage Editore, Bologna, 2024, ISBN 979-1281447714.
