= Sergio Romano =

Sergio Romano may refer to:

- Sergio Romano (writer), Italian journalist and diplomat
- Sergio Romano (futsal player)
