= Claudio Bisogniero =

Italian diplomat

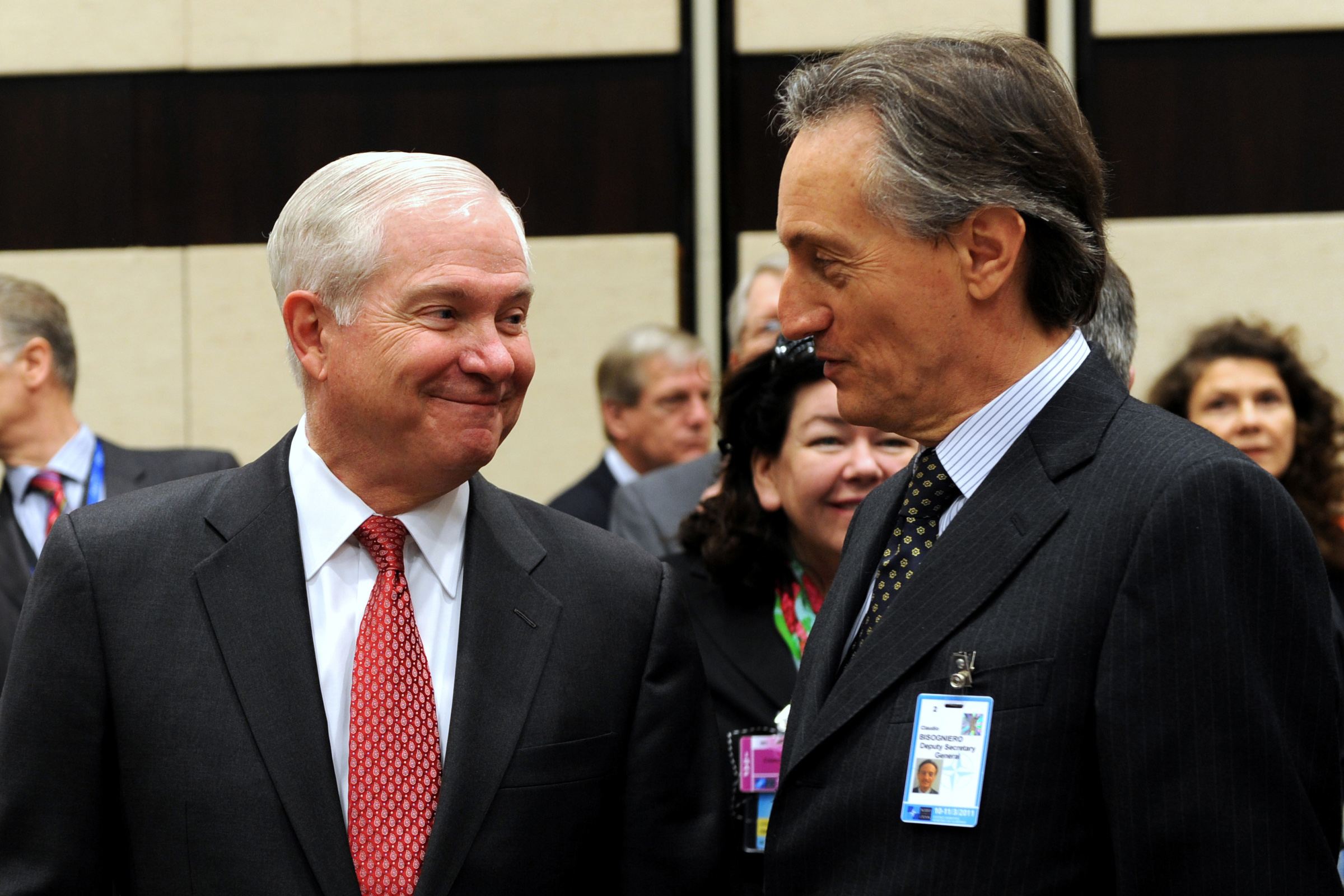
Secretary of Defense Robert M. Gates speaks with NATO Deputy Secretary General Claudio Bisogniero (right) at NATO headquarters in Brussels.

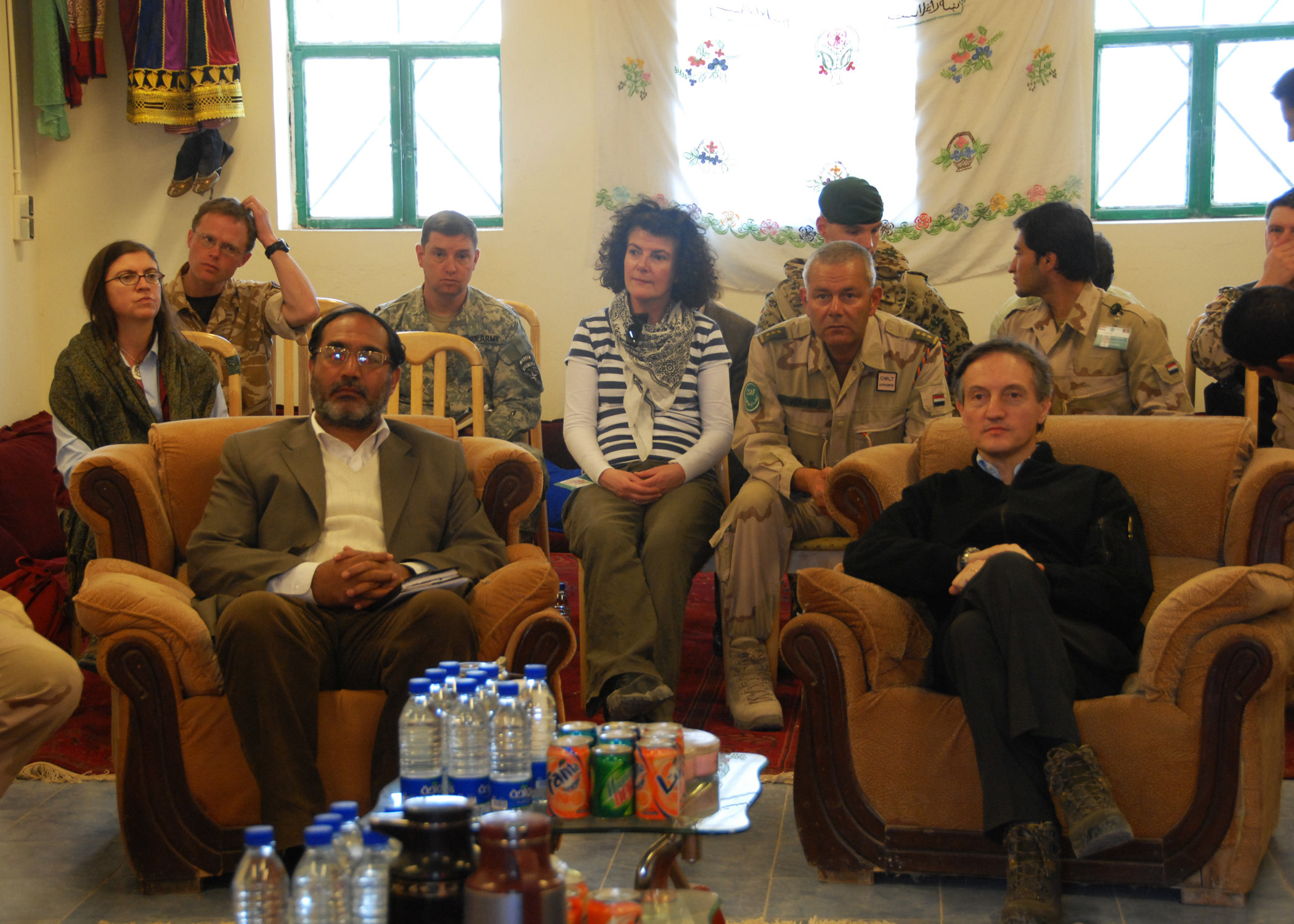
Governor Asadullah Hamdam and NATO Deputy Secretary General Claudio Bisogniero

Claudio Bisogniero (born 2 July 1954) is a retired Italian diplomat. From 2007 until 2012, he was the Deputy Secretary General of NATO before serving as Ambassador to the United States (2012–2016). From 2016 until 2019 he was Italy’s Permanent Representative to NATO.

== Biography ==
He graduated from La Sapienza in 1976 with a degree in political science. He began his diplomatic career in 1978. He has held important posts in the Italian Embassies in China, the United States of America, and in the Italian Representations to NATO and the United Nations (UN). He also served in the General Secretariat of the Presidency of the Italian Republic, Office of the Diplomatic Adviser to the President of the Republic (1988–1989).

Since 2008 he has been a member of the Italy–USA Foundation.

From 2002 to 2005 he was Deputy Director General for Multilateral Political Affairs at the Ministry of Foreign Affairs responsible for UN, NATO, G8, disarmament and human rights issues. From 2005 to 2007 Director General with responsibility for America.

On 31 December 2007 he became Deputy Secretary General of NATO in Brussels, succeeding Alessandro Minuto-Rizzo, thus becoming the number two of the Atlantic Alliance after Secretary General Anders Fogh Rasmussen. He held the post until January 2012 when he was replaced by US Ambassador Alexander Vershbow.

From 2012 to 2016 he was the Italian Ambassador to the United States in Washington.

From 2016 to 2019 he was the Italian Permanent Representative to NATO in Brussels.

He is married to Laura Denise Noce Benigni Olivieri; they have a daughter and a son.

== Honors ==
Order of Merit of the Italian Republic 1st Class / Knight Grand Cross – August 5, 2013

== See also ==
- Italy–United States relations
- Ministry of Foreign Affairs (Italy)
- Foreign relations of Italy

Diplomatic posts
Preceded by Giulio Terzi di Sant'Agata	Ambassador of Italy to the United States; 2012–2016	Succeeded by Armando Varricchio
Preceded by Mariangela Zappia	Permanent Representative of Italy to NATO; 2016–2019	Succeeded by Francesco Talò
