= List of ambassadors of Italy to NATO =

Permanent Representative of Italy to the North Atlantic Council
- Rappresentanza Permanente presso il Consiglio Atlantico in Bruxelles
- Style: His Excellency
- Inaugural holder: Alberto Rossi Longhi
- Formation: 21 November 1950

The Italian Permanent Representative to the North Atlantic Council is the Permanent Representative of the Italian government to the North Atlantic Council.

Diplomatic accreditation	Permanent Representative	Observations	List of prime ministers of Italy	Term end
21 November 1950	Alberto Rossi Longhi	Minister Plenipotentiary and Ambassador	Ferruccio Parri	31 May 1954
1 June 1954	Adolfo Alessandrini		Amintore Fanfani	17 January 1958
18 January 1958	Umberto Grazzi		Amintore Fanfani	8 May 1959
9 May 1959	Adolfo Alessandrini	From January 1959 to May 1959 he was Italian Ambassador to Canada	Antonio Segni	2 October 1967
3 October 1967	Carlo De Ferrariis Salzano		Giovanni Leone	15 January 1971
22 January 1971	Felice Catalano di Melilli		Emilio Colombo	16 January 1980
18 January 1980	Vincenzo Tornetta	(*He was born in Piazza Armerina (Enna) in 1917 ): In 1939 he was graduated in Political Science at the University of Florence.; In 1948 he entered the diplomatic service.; From 1951 to 1955 he was assigned to Caracas.; In 1955 he was transferred to the United Nations Representation in New York.; In 1961 he returned to the Ministry of Foreign Affairs.; From 1964 to 1967 he was sent back to New York.; From 1965 to 1966, in the period in which Amintore Fanfani was president of the UN General Assembly he served in the United Nations Secretariat.; From 1967 to 1972 he was Italian Ambassador to Vietnam (Saigon).; In 1972 he became Director General of Emigration Social Affairs in the Ministry of Foreign Affairs (Italy).; In 1974 he was appointed general director of the Italo-Latin American Institute.	Francesco Cossiga	14 April 1983
14 April 1983	Sergio Romano (writer)		Bettino Craxi	18 September 1985
19 September 1985	Francesco Paolo Fulci		Bettino Craxi	15 January 1991
15 June 1991	Enzo Perlot	(*born on 17 November 1933, in Mezzolombardo): Son of the late Augusto and Ida (Paoli) Perlot.; In 1989 he was Italian Ambassador to Portugal.	Giulio Andreotti	6 May 1993
26 July 1993	Giovanni Jannuzzi	(*Born in Rome, 6 November 1935 ): From 1980 to 1982 he was Italian Ambassador to Nigeria (Lagos).	Carlo Azeglio Ciampi	1 May 1998
2 May 1998	Amedeo De Franchis	(*born on 9 August 1939 in Naples): From 1984 to January 1988 he was Italian Ambassador to Pakistan.	Massimo D’Alema	6 September 2002
7 September 2002	Maurizio Moreno		Silvio Berlusconi	22 February 2007
12 April 2007	Stefano Stefanini		Silvio Berlusconi	1 December 2010
12 December 2010	Riccardo Sessa		Silvio Berlusconi	31 December 2012
21 January 2013	Gabriele Checchia		Mario Monti	19 September 2014
1 October 2014	Maria Angela Zappia Caillaux	Minister Plenipotentiary	Matteo Renzi	6 March 2016
7 March 2016	Claudio Bisogniero	(* born in Rome, on 2 July 1954)	Matteo Renzi	12 April 2019
15 April 2019	Francesco Talò	(* born in La Spezia, on 16 August 1958)	Giuseppe Conte	12 February 2021
