= Sergio Vento =

Italian diplomat (born 1938)

Sergio Vento (born May 30, 1938) is an Italian diplomat, former Permanent Representative of Italy to the United Nations and Italian Ambassador to the United States.

== Career ==
Sergio Vento was born in Rome. He studied political sciences at the State University of Rome.

After having served in various positions in The Hague, Buenos Aires and Ankara, he had been a diplomatic councillor to the following Italian Prime Ministers: Giuliano Amato, Carlo Azeglio Ciampi, Silvio Berlusconi, Lamberto Dini. He served as Italian Ambassador to Yugoslavia, France, United Nations, United States of America. He retired from the career and become active in the following fields: law consulting, banking, infrastructures, and University teaching. A significant number of his relatives are American of Italian descent.

== Honours ==
Order of Merit of the Italian Republic 1st Class / Knight Grand Cross – June 2, 1994

- 1999, Commandeur of the Légion d'honneur, France.
- 2003, honorary Doctorate of Law, St. John's University in New York.

== See also ==
- Ministry of Foreign Affairs (Italy)
- Foreign relations of Italy

Preceded by Francesco Paolo Fulci	Italian Ambassador to the United Nations; 2000 - 2003	Succeeded by Marcello Spatafora
