= Maurizio Massari =

Italian diplomat

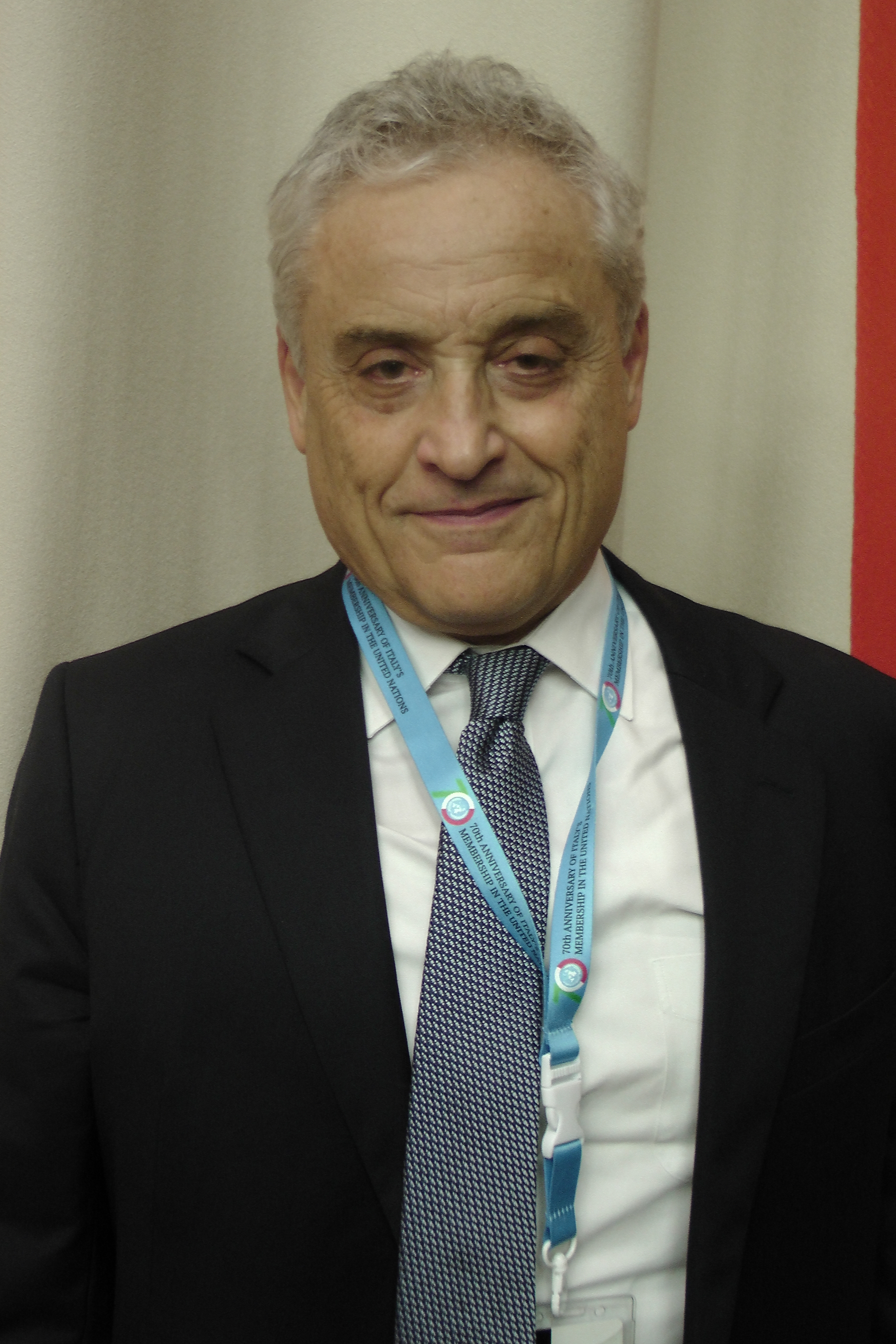
- Maurizio Massari at the UN Tech Over in 2025

Permanent Representative of Italy to the United Nations
- Incumbent
- Assumed office 19 July 2021
- Preceded by: Mariangela Zappìa

Personal details
- Born: 25 June 1959 Naples

Maurizio Massari is an Italian diplomat and the current Permanent Representative of Italy to the United Nations in New York, a position he has held since 19 July 2021, succeeding Mariangela Zappia.

== Early life and education ==
Massari was born in Naples, Italy, in 1959. He graduated in 1982 with a degree in Political Science from the University of Naples "L’Orientale", specializing in Eastern European affairs.

In 1998, he obtained a Fellowship Certificate from the Weatherhead Center for International Affairs at Harvard University in Cambridge, Massachusetts.

He later earned a Master’s Degree in International Public Policy from the Johns Hopkins University School of Advanced International Studies (SAIS) in Washington, D.C., in 2001. An excerpt from his thesis was published in The International Spectator under the title “US Foreign Policy Decision‐Making during the Clinton Administration.”

He is fluent in Italian, English, and French; he is intermediate at Russian, and has a basic knowledge of German.

== Senior Diplomatic Roles and Multilateral Engagements ==
An ambassador with over 40 years of diplomatic experience, Maurizio Massari currently serves as the Permanent Representative of Italy to the United Nations in New York.

He is Vice President of the 79th session of the United Nations General Assembly, and since December 2023, a member of the Advisory Group of the Central Emergency Response Fund (CERF), established by the UN General Assembly within the Office for the Coordination of Humanitarian Affairs (OCHA), with a three-year mandate.

In June 2025, he was elected by acclamation as Chair of the UN First Committee, responsible for disarmament and international security matters, with a one-year term beginning in September 2025, during the 80th session of the General Assembly.

He previously served as Vice President of the United Nations Economic and Social Council (ECOSOC) (July 2022 – July 2023) and Vice President of the Executive Board of UN Women, the UN’s principal agency for women's rights (2023). Since 2021, he has been an International Gender Champion.

He also served as Permanent Representative of Italy to the European Union (June 2016 – May 2021) and as Special Envoy of the Italian Minister of Foreign Affairs for the Mediterranean and the Middle East (2012–2013).

== Professional Experience ==
Massari joined the Italian diplomatic service in 1985 and was promoted to the rank of Ambassador on 20 January 2015. Over his four-decade career, he has served in multiple key posts both abroad and within the Italian Ministry of Foreign Affairs and International Cooperation.

=== Overseas assignments ===
- Brussels (June 2016 – May 2021): Permanent Representative of Italy to the European Union;
- Cairo (February 2013): Ambassador of Italy to Egypt;
- Belgrade (January 2003): Head of the OSCE Mission to Serbia and Montenegro;
- Washington, D.C. (July 1998 – June 2001): First Political Counselor at the Italian Embassy, responsible for U.S. foreign policy toward Russia, the former Soviet Union, Central and Eastern Europe, and the Western Balkans. Also in charge of Embassy relations with U.S. think tanks and universities;
- London (July 1990 – June 1994): Deputy Head of the Economic and Commercial Section at the Italian Embassy, responsible for bilateral and multilateral economic relations and EU policy;
- Moscow (November 1986 – July 1990): Head of Press and Internal Politics Section at the Italian Embassy, in charge of monitoring and reporting on Russian and Soviet political developments, and media relations with both Russian and Western press.

=== Ministry of Foreign Affairs and International Cooperation (Italy) ===
- Special Envoy of the Minister for the Mediterranean and Middle East (Jan 2012 – Feb 2013);
- Spokesperson and Head of the Press Service of the Minister of Foreign Affairs (2009 – Jan 2012);
- Director of the Policy Planning Unit (2007 – 2008); Co-chair of the Strategic Reflection Group with Marta Dassù; co-author of the "Italy 2020 Foreign Policy Report";
- Head of the Western Balkans Office (June 2001 – Dec 2002), overseeing Italian foreign policy toward the former Yugoslavia and Albania;
- Deputy EU Affairs Coordinator, Directorate General for Economic Affairs (June 1996 – Aug 1997); member of the Italian delegation to the Intergovernmental Conference for the Amsterdam Treaty;
- Chief of Staff to the Deputy Minister of Foreign Affairs (June 1994 – June 1996);
- Deputy Head of Section, Directorate General for Economic Affairs (Feb 1985 – Nov 1986), responsible for bilateral economic relations with Western Europe, Canada, and the United States.

== Personal life ==
He has been married to Mary Lorefice since 2001. He is a supporter of the Napoli football team.

== Academic activity and publications ==
Massari has been invited to speak at numerous seminars, conferences, and academic events across Italy, Europe, and the United States. He is the author of several books and scholarly contributions, including:

- La Grande Svolta: La Riforma Politica in Urss 1986–1990 (1990) – a study on the political reforms under Mikhail Gorbachev;
- Russia: Democrazia europea o potenza globale? A vent'anni dalla fine della guerra fredda (2009) – an analysis of post-communist Russia’s foreign and domestic trajectory.

He has also published articles, essays and opinion pieces, in both Italian and English, on Russian foreign policy and internal developments, EU foreign policy, the Western Balkans, and the Caucasus - his most frequent areas of analysis, including:

- Do All Roads Lead to Brussels? Analysis of the Different Trajectories of Croatia, Serbia-Montenegro and Bosnia-Herzegovina (2005) – a comparative study of the EU accession paths and internal political developments of three Western Balkan countries after the Yugoslav wars;
- Russia can play a vital role in the west’s security (2008) – an opinion piece advocating for a strategic Western engagement with Russia to support its modernization and international integration;
- Italian ambassador to the EU: Italy needs Europe’s help (2020) – a call for EU solidarity during the COVID-19 crisis.
- Ricordi diplomatici dall’URSS di Gorbaciov (2022) – a firsthand diplomatic memoir recounting Massari’s experiences in Moscow during Gorbachev’s leadership_{;}
- 'La guerra riaccende la faida tra Sud del mondo e Occidente' (2022) – analysis of UN divisions over the Ukraine war.

== Awards and recognition ==
Grand Officer of the Order of Merit of the Italian Republic (2024), awarded by the President of the Italian Republic.
