= Marcello Spatafora =

Italian diplomat

Permanent Representative of Italy to the United Nations
- In office 2003 – 2008
- Preceded by: Sergio Vento
- Succeeded by: Giulio Terzi di Sant'Agata

Personal details
- Born: 30 July 1941 (age 85) Innsbruck, Nazi Germany
- Education: University of Pisa

Marcello Spatafora (born 30 July 1941) is a retired Italian diplomat, former Permanent Representative of Italy to the United Nations.

== Career ==
Marcello Spatafora was born in Innsbruck, Austria (then part of Nazi Germany). He studied law at the University of Pisa, at the prestigious Collegio Medico-Giuridico of the Scuola Normale Superiore, known today as the Sant'Anna School of Advanced Studies.

He served as the Permanent Representative of Italy to the United Nations from April 2003 until August 2008. He was President of the United Nations Security Council in December 2007. From 2000 until April 2003, he served in the Italian Ministry of Foreign Affairs as Director General for Multilateral Economic and Financial Cooperation.

He also served as Ambassador of Italy to Albania from 1997 to 1999, and Ambassador to Australia from 1993 to 1997. In 1989-1990 he was the Chief of the Italian Delegation responsible for organizing the country's presidency of the European Economic Community. He served as Ambassador to Malta from 1986 to 1989, and Ambassador to Malaysia from 1980 to 1986. Prior to this time, he served in different positions in Paris, Belgrade and Beirut.

Since 2008, he has been a staunch supporter of United Nations activities worldwide, including, in particular, the humanitarian relief efforts led by OCHA.

His wife, Laura, is a former medical researcher. His son, Nikola Spatafora, is an official at the World Bank in Washington, DC.

== Honours ==
Order of Merit of the Italian Republic 1st Class / Knight Grand Cross – 2 June 2005

== See also ==
- Ministry of Foreign Affairs (Italy)
- Foreign relations of Italy

Preceded by Sergio Vento	Italian Ambassador to the United Nations; 2003 - 25 August 2008	Succeeded by Giulio Terzi Sant'Agata
