= Enrica Lexie =

Italian ship built in 2008

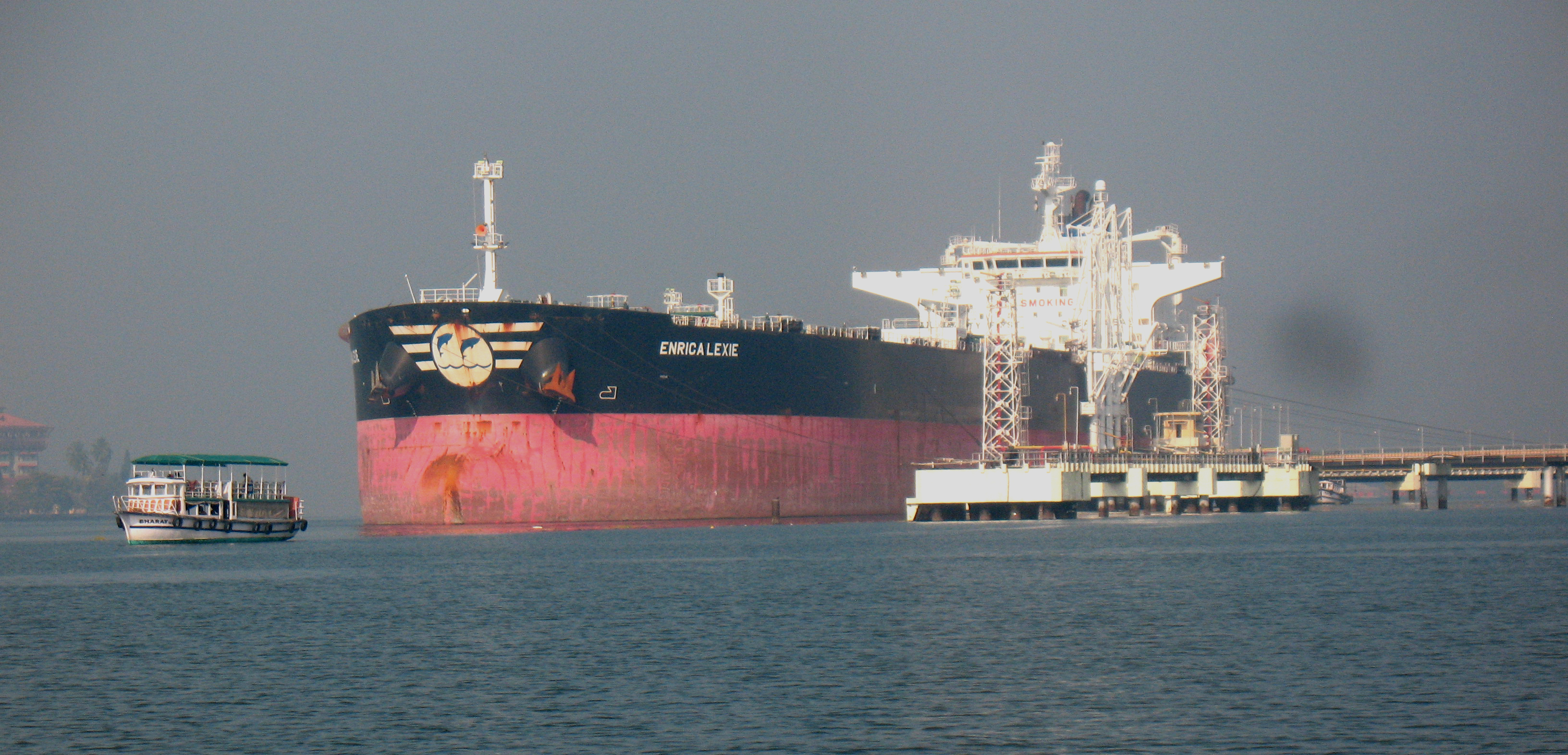
- Enrica Lexie at Kochi

History
- Name: Enrica Lexie
- Owner: Dolphin Tankers, Naples
- Port of registry: Italy
- Launched: 2 June 2008
- Completed: 2008
- Identification: IMO number: 9489297; Call sign: ICKC; MMSI number: 247232700
- Fate: Renamed as Olympic Sky in 2014.

History
- Name: Olympic Sky
- Owner: Olympic Shipping & Management
- Port of registry: Greece until 2015; Marshall Islands (since 2015)
- Identification: IMO number: 9489297; Call sign: SVCB5 (2013–2015); V7NZ2 (from 2015); MMSI number: 241346000 (2013–2015); MMSI number: 538006517 (from 2015)
- Status: in active service

General characteristics
- Type: Oil tanker
- Tonnage: 58,418 GT 104,255 DWT
- Length: 243.8 m (800 ft)
- Beam: 42 m (138 ft)

Enrica Lexie (called Olympic Sky since 2013) is an Italian Aframax oil-tanker. In 2012, the ship was involved in the shooting of two Indian fisherman in the Laccadive Sea.

== History ==
=== 2008–2012 ===
The Enrica Lexie was built in 2008. She was originally owned by Naples-based Dolphin Tankers whose parent company is Fratelli d'Amato.

=== 2012 shooting incident ===
On 15 February 2012, the Enrica Lexia was involved in the shooting of two fisherman in the Laccadive Sea off the Indian coast. The tanker was taken to the port of Kochi on 17 February 2012 under escort by the Indian Coast Guard. The ship was allowed to leave 80 days later, on 6 May 2012 after the owners posted a surety bond.

=== 2013–2015 ===
In 2013, she was renamed as Olympic Sky and registered under a Greek flag; vessel management was transferred to Olympic Shipping & Management SA. AIS plots show the tanker operating in the Indian Ocean region.

In 2015, the tanker was registered again in the Marshall Islands.
