= Francesco Paolo Fulci =

Italian diplomat (1931–2022)

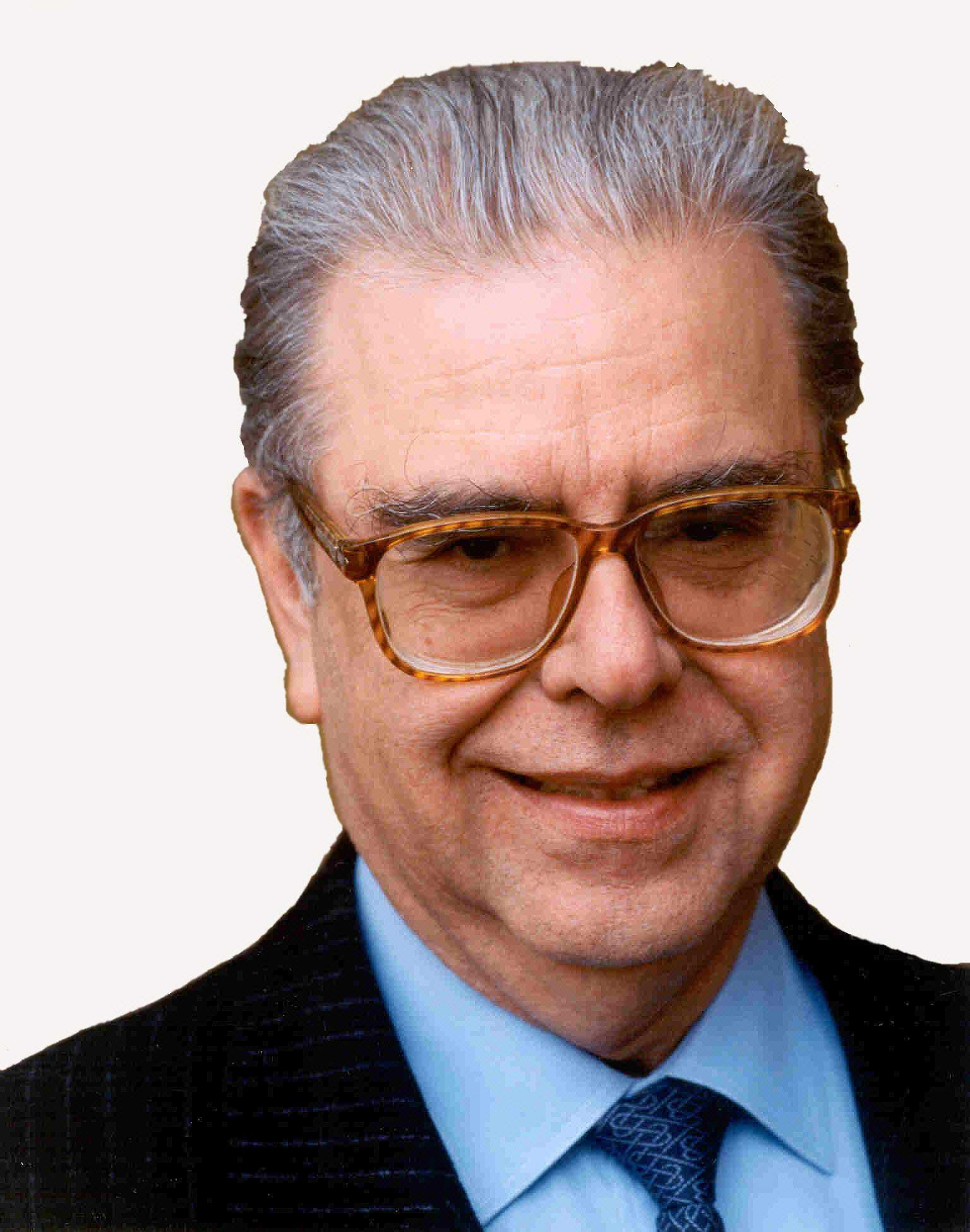

Italian Ambassador to the United Nations
- In office 1993–1999

Personal details
- Born: 19 March 1931 Messina, Italy
- Died: 21 January 2022 (aged 90)
- Occupation: Corporate president

Francesco Paolo Fulci (19 March 1931 – 21 January 2022) was an Italian diplomat who served as Ambassador to the United Nations.

== Education ==
Fulci graduated with honours in law in 1953 from the University of Messina and obtained a master's degree in comparative law at Columbia University, New York, where he studied as a Fulbright scholar from 1954 to 1955. He later received the diploma from The Hague Academy of International Law, and attended the College of Europe in Bruges, Belgium, from 1955 to 1956.

== Early diplomatic career ==
Fulci entered the Italian foreign service in 1956. He served as secretary-general of Italy's Executive Committee for Intelligence and Security from 1991 until 1993. From 1985 to 1991, he was Italy's Ambassador to the NATO (North Atlantic Treaty Organization) in Brussels. From 1980 to 1985, Ambassador Fulci served as Italy's ambassador to Canada. From 1976 to 1980, he was chief of staff to the Speaker of the Italian Senate, Amintore Fanfani.

During his long diplomatic career, Ambassador Fulci served his country in other important world capitals, including New York City, Moscow, Paris, and Tokyo.

== United Nations ==
Ambassador Fulci was Permanent Representative of Italy to the United Nations (1993–1999). In 1999, he became president of the United Nations Economic and Social Council (ECOSOC), after serving as its vice-president a year earlier. In 1997, he was elected to the United Nations Committee on the Rights of the Child. During his tenure as Italian Ambassador to the United Nations (extended by the Italian Government for two more years after his retirement age), Ambassador Fulci served twice as President of the Security Council.

At the UN, he co-founded, with the Ambassadors of Egypt, Mexico and Pakistan, the so-called Coffee Club, a powerful lobby of countries formed in the early 1990s to oppose the expansion of the permanent membership of the Security Council, and push for the enlargement of non-permanent seats. In 1998 Ambassador Fulci masterminded the procedural resolution, introduced by the Coffee Club and approved by the General Assembly, which states that any resolution or decision on the reform of the Security Council, at all stages of the reform process, has to be adopted with a majority of two-thirds of the UN member states. The Coffee Club was recently revived by Italy and Pakistan under the name of Uniting for Consensus to block a renewed bid by Germany, India, Japan, and Brazil to obtain a permanent seat in the Council.

In his capacity as president of the Economic and Social Council, Ambassador Fulci underlined in a "Manifesto on Poverty Eradication" ten priorities: they were later enshrined in the UN Millennium Declaration and in the UN Millennium Development Goals, adopted in September 2000, as well as in the "Monterrey Consensus" of 2002, at the end of the International Conference on Financing for Development.

== Later life and death ==
Fulci joined the Ferrero Confectionery Group in 2000 as vice president and served as president of Ferrero SpA from 2011 to 2019. He was member of the Italy-USA Foundation.

He died on 21 January 2022, at the age of 90.

== Honors ==
- 1981, honorary doctorate of law, University of Windsor in Ontario
- 1996, honorary doctorate of law, St. Thomas Aquinas College in New York
- 1998, honorary doctorate of law, St. John's University in New York
- Knight of Honour and Devotion of the Sovereign Military Order of Malta.

Order of Merit of the Italian Republic 1st Class / Knight Grand Cross – 2 June 1992

== See also ==
- Ministry of Foreign Affairs (Italy)
- Foreign relations of Italy
