= Permanent Representative of Italy to the United Nations =

Permanent Representatives of Italy to the United Nations from October 1, 1947

Permanent Representative of Italy to the United Nations of Ministry of Foreign Affairs
- Incumbent; Maurizio Massari since July 19, 2021
- Style: His Excellency (formal); Mr. Ambassador (informal)
- Reports to: National Security Council
- Website: italyun.esteri.it/en/

The Permanent Representative of Italy to the United Nations is the leader of the diplomatic mission representing Italy at the United Nations Organization. Italy has been a member of the United Nations since December 14, 1955.

Maurizio Massari is the current Permanent Representative of Italy to the United Nations in New York. In this role, Massari serves as Vice-President of the 79th session of the United Nations General Assembly. He has been serving in his position as permanent representative since July 19, 2025.

== Permanent Representatives of Italy to the United Nations ==
#	Name	Years served	U.N. Secretary(ies)-General	President(s) of Italy
01	Luciano Mascia	1947–1950	Trygve Lie	Enrico De Nicola, Luigi Einaudi
02	Gastone Guidotti	1950–1953	Trygve Lie, Dag Hammarskjöld	Luigi Einaudi
03	Alberico Casardi	1953–1956	Dag Hammarskjöld	Luigi Einaudi, Giovanni Gronchi
04	Leonardo Vitetti	1956–1958	Dag Hammarskjöld	Giovanni Gronchi
05	Egidio Ortona	1958–1961	Dag Hammarskjöld	Giovanni Gronchi
06	Vittorio Zoppi	1961–1964	U Thant	Giovanni Gronchi, Antonio Segni
07	Piero Vinci	1964–1973	U Thant, Kurt Waldheim	Giuseppe Saragat, Giovanni Leone
08	Eugenio Plaja	1973–1975	Kurt Waldheim	Giovanni Leone
09	Piero Vinci	1975–1979	Kurt Waldheim	Giovanni Leone, Sandro Pertini
10	Umberto La Rocca	1979–1984	Kurt Waldheim, Javier Pérez de Cuéllar	Sandro Pertini
11	Maurizio Bucci	1984–1988	Javier Pérez de Cuéllar	Sandro Pertini, Francesco Cossiga
12	Giovanni Migliuolo	1988–1989	Javier Pérez de Cuéllar	Francesco Cossiga
13	Vieri Traxler	1989–1993	Javier Pérez de Cuéllar, Boutros Boutros-Ghali	Francesco Cossiga, Oscar Luigi Scalfaro
14	Francesco Paolo Fulci	1993–1999	Boutros Boutros-Ghali, Kofi Annan	Oscar Luigi Scalfaro
15	Sergio Vento	1999–2003	Kofi Annan	Carlo Azeglio Ciampi
16	Marcello Spatafora	4 May 2003–25 August 2008	Kofi Annan, Ban Ki-moon	Carlo Azeglio Ciampi, Giorgio Napolitano
17	Giulio Terzi di Sant'Agata	25 August 2008–8 November 2009	Ban Ki-moon	Giorgio Napolitano
18	Cesare Ragaglini	8 November 2009–20 September 2013	Ban Ki-moon	Giorgio Napolitano
19	Sebastiano Cardi	20 September 2013–13 August 2018	Ban Ki-moon	Giorgio Napolitano
20	Maria Angela Zappia	13 August 2018–19 July 2021	António Guterres	Sergio Mattarella
21	Maurizio Massari	19 July 2021–present	António Guterres	Sergio Mattarella
