= Enrica Lexie case =

Fatal shooting of Indian fishermen and related incidents

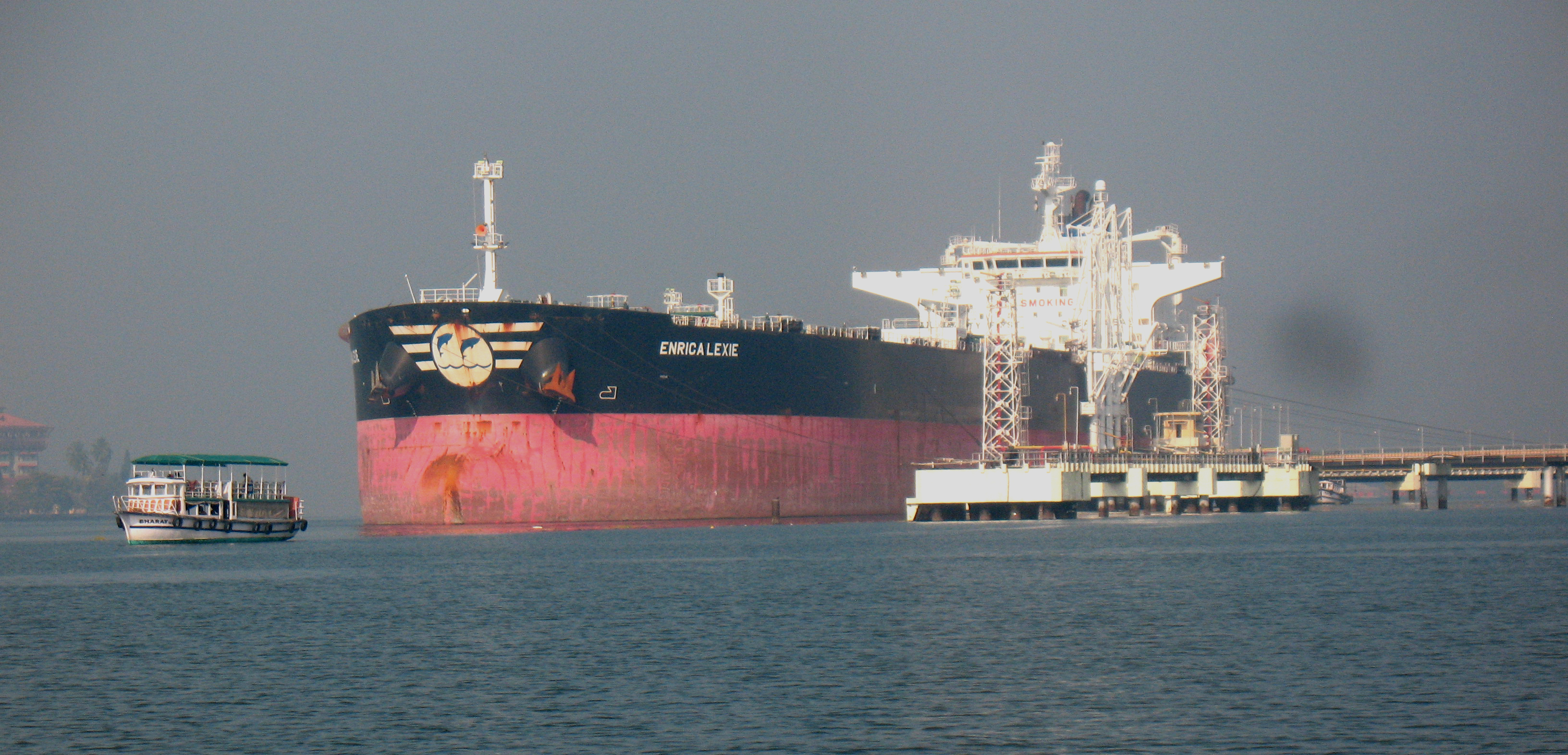
Enrica Lexie, the ship involved in the case

The Enrica Lexie case was an international controversy about a shooting in international waters off the western coast of India. On 15 February 2012, two Indian fishermen were killed off the coast of Kerala, India, aboard St. Antony. India alleged that two Italian marines aboard the Italian-flagged commercial oil tanker MV Enrica Lexie had killed the fishermen. Shortly after the incident, the Indian Navy intercepted Enrica Lexie and detained the two Italian marines, which sparked a conflict over legal jurisdiction and functional immunity between the governments of India and Italy.

Both marines were released and returned to Italy after they were detained in India without being formally charged for any crime for two and four years, respectively. Meanwhile, an independent United Nations court was charged to resolve the jurisdictional conflict. That was following a European Parliament resolution of January 2015, stating that "no charge has been brought by the Indian authorities" and that the "Italian marines' detention without charge is a serious breach of their human rights".

On 2 July 2020, the Permanent Court of Arbitration recognized the functional immunity of the two Italian marines, noting that they were engaged in a mission on behalf of the Italian government, and thus ruled that the process should continue in Italy. Italy was required to agree with India on compensation for the deaths and for the physical and moral damage to the crew members and the vessel. On 31 January 2022, the Judge for Preliminary Investigations of the Tribunal of Rome dismissed all accusations against Latorre and Girone, arguing that they opened fire because they believed themselves to be in the presence of pirates. The incident drew attention to the practice of commercial shipping using armed guards.

== History ==
On 15 February 2012, Indian nationals Ajesh Binki and Jelestein aboard St. Antony were killed allegedly as a result of gunshot wounds following a confrontation with Enrica Lexie in international waters, off the Indian coast. The nature of the confrontation has been in contention. MV Enrica Lexie was travelling from Singapore to Egypt with a crew of 34, including 19 Indians, accompanied by six Italian Navy marines. The captain of St. Antony, Freddie Louis, claimed that his vessel was returning from its fishing expedition in the Laccadive Sea when men on board Enrica Lexie began firing at them without provocation for approximately two minutes. According to the Indian Coast Guard and the crew of St. Antony, the incident occurred at about 16:30 IST on 15 February 2012 when St. Antony was some 20.5 nautical miles (38.0 km; 23.6 mi) off the Indian coast within the Contiguous Zone (CZ) area of India's exclusive economic zone (EEZ).

Indian Navy press release announcing that Enrica Lexie was detained

After the incident, Enrica Lexie was intercepted in the Lakshadweep archipelago and compelled to proceed to Kochi port by the Indian Coast Guard. The Italian Foreign Minister Giulio Terzi, in an open letter to the Italian newspaper Eco di Bergamo, alleged that "the entering of the Enrica Lexie into Indian waters has been the result of a subterfuge by the local police, who required the ship master to head for the port of Kochi in order to contribute to the identification of some suspected pirates." On 30 March 2013, Indian Foreign minister Salman Khurshid rejected claims of subterfuge as unsubstantiated.

Two Italian special corps Marines, Capo di 1ª Classe Massimiliano Latorre and Secondo Capo Salvatore Girone, were remanded to judicial custody for interrogation on charges of homicide under Section 302 of the Indian Penal Code. Based on the postmortem carried out on 16 February 2012, Kerala Police charged the two marines with murder. K. Sasikala from Thiruvananthapuram's forensic medicine institute extracted two projectiles during the autopsy but measured only the length, not their caliber which did not match their 5.56 Beretta. The two marines were allowed to return to Italy in early 2013 on temporary leave. Once the marines landed in Italy, Italian authorities notified India they would not return the marines unless there was a guarantee they would not face the death penalty. India responded by summoning the Italian ambassador to Delhi for negotiations. As the two had been allowed to go home for Christmas due to a personal undertaking from the Italian ambassador it was made clear to the ambassador that personal undertakings are not covered under diplomatic immunity and as such if the two did not return, the ambassador was liable to be charged with fraud. After tense discussions, the two marines were returned, without any of the guarantees requested by Italy. This caused Terzi to resign, in defense of "honor of the country, of the armed forces, and Italian diplomacy". On 4 April 2013, the Indian National Investigation Agency (NIA) filed a first information report against the marines in relation to charges including murder, attempted murder, mischief, and conspiracy.

In June 2013, Italian media reported that four other members of the VPD team were not in the ship's citadel after the general alarm was sounded and speculated that the two marines held in India might have taken responsibility for the actions of other members of the VPD team.

In January 2014, India decided to prosecute the marines under the Convention for the Suppression of Unlawful Acts Against the Safety of Maritime Navigation (SUA). The SUA Convention was passed in 1988 with the goal of suppressing international terrorism. Italy criticised the prosecution pursuant to the SUA Convention as equating the incident to an act of terrorism. On 7 March 2014, India dropped the SUA charges against the marines. On 7 February 2014, the charges were downgraded from murder to violence, meaning the marines would not face the death penalty if convicted.

Italian authorities maintained that India lacked jurisdiction in judging the case, since, based on the Enrica Lexie positional records, the ship was outside Indian territorial waters, in the international navigation area. Furthermore, they maintained that India lacked jurisdiction for arresting the marines, since they were on an Italian ship in international waters, charged with security duties. As such, they were military personnel on duty in defense of a part of Italy's national territory, and could not be considered terrorists or accused of murder. India countered that if the marines were on military duty and had killed unarmed civilians, they could be charged with war crimes under the Geneva convention, thus murder was the lesser charge.

Indian authorities delayed the formalization of accusations, thus stemming the reaction from Italian authorities, who sought support from the European Parliament. The latter decided to back Italy, with special reference to the lack of any formal accusation to justify the detention. In January 2015 the European Parliament issued an official resolution, according to which the human rights of the marines were violated. That month, Latorre underwent heart surgery in Italy after he was allowed to repatriate for medical reasons.

== Alleged piracy threat ==
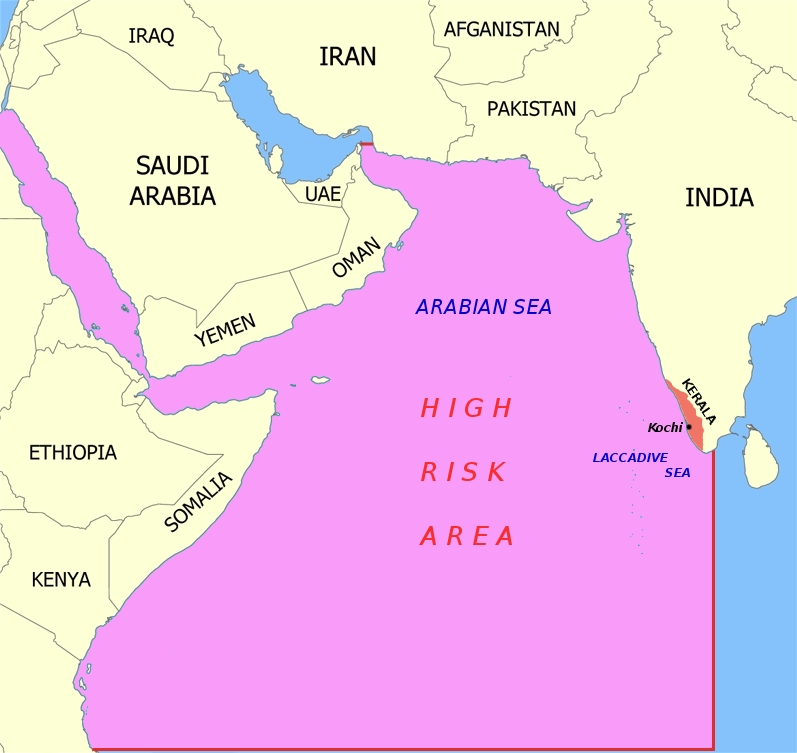
The High Risk Area planning chart published by United Kingdom Hydrographic Office (2011)

The western Indian coast forms part of the "High Risk Area" for pirate attacks. On 21 February 2012, the International Maritime Bureau (IMB) reported that a Greek-flagged tanker, Olympic Flair, sailing some 2.5 nautical miles (4.6 km; 2.9 mi) from the port of Kochi was attacked on the same day of the Enrica Lexie incident. The ICC—in a communication to the Italian Navy—confirmed the IMO number of the vessel, confirming it was indeed Olympic Flair.

The Indian Coast Guard stated that while it was accepted procedure to report piracy events or suspicious activities immediately to Maritime Rescue Coordination Centre (MRCC), Enrica Lexie continued sailing for 70 kilometres (43 mi) on its route to Egypt without reporting the incident. The ship reported the shooting only when contacted by the Coast Guard about two and a half hours later, after which they were asked to proceed to Kochi.

Umberto Vitelli, master of Enrica Lexie, responded to Indian investigators that he was surprised by the marines' decision to open fire and that it was only after he heard gunshots that he increased to full speed and sounded the foghorn and the general alarm. In addition, the ship's chief officer James Mandley Samson stated to Kerala police that despite having binoculars "I couldn't see any person with weapons in the boat". Depositions given by the marines to Indian investigators regarding the use of live fire in the direction of an approaching fishing boat stated that Latorre fired twelve rounds of ammunition and Girone fired eight in two bursts as warning shots.

Italian news agencies quoted Vice-Captain Charles Noviello as saying: "I'm sure the boat that came close was not the St. Antony. They do not match some details of the vessel I have seen and what I have been shown in the picture of the officials of the Indian Merchant Navy." In a telephone interview with Agenzia Nazionale Stampa Associata (ANSA), he added "I remember the cabin, where there was the helm, was of a different color from what I saw later in the picture." Noviello, who was present at the time when Latorre and Girone opened fire, added: "none of the people on the boat fell to the ground ... the boat was 40–50 meters from the tanker ... I saw that there were 5 or 6 people on board, but I'm not sure if it was more."

In the marines' affidavit that urging the Kerala High Court to quash the First Information Report (FIR) against them, the document states: "The master of the vessel increased the speed of the ship to 14 knots (about 28 km/per hour) and reduced the speed to 13 knots once the piracy attack was averted. The master also activated the Ship Security Alert System (SSAS) which sent out signals to the Italian Maritime Rescue and Coordination Centre (MRCC). The master also reported the incident on the mercury chart which links together and transfers information to the community including several navies across the world fighting piracy, including to the Indian Navy headquarters. The 'Military Report' was also done. A report was sent to MSCHOA at UK. Since the attempted attack was averted, the vessel continued on its scheduled course of journey." No documentary evidence was supplied in support of the affidavit.

== Italian investigations ==
On 26 February 2012, a five-member team of Italian naval officials examined the St. Antony berthed at Neendakara harbour. The Italian team consisted of Major General Paolo Romano, Admiral Alessandro Piroli, Major Luca Flebus, Major Paolo Fratini and Commander Geam Paul. In March 2012, Italian prosecutors opened an investigation into potential criminal negligence by the marines. On 10 May 2012, the four other members of the VPD team reportedly told prosecutors that they did not witness the shooting. Whilst in Italy for the Christmas holiday Latorre and Girone were interviewed by prosecutors. In addition, the marines appeared before a military tribunal in Rome in March 2013.

On 6 April 2013, an Italian military report on the incident, dated 11 May 2012, was leaked. The document reported that, according to Indian authorities, St. Antony had been involved in the incident, but that bullets used in the incident were fired from rifles assigned to two other marines.

On 31 January 2022, the Judge for Preliminary Investigations of the Tribunal of Rome dismissed all accusations against Latorre and Girone, arguing that they opened fire because they believed themselves to be in the presence of pirates.

== Payments ==
The Government of Kerala granted solatium of ₹5 lakh (equivalent to ₹9.4 lakh or US$9,800 in 2023) to the victims' families. The Government of Tamil Nadu also granted solatium of ₹5 lakh (equivalent to ₹9.4 lakh or US$9,800 in 2023) to Ajesh Binki's family. In addition to the compensation, the Government of Kerala employed Gelastine's wife. In addition, civil claims were commenced against the owner of the Enrica Lexie by Gelastine's family, Ajesh Binki's sisters, and Freddy J, the owner of St. Antony. Subsequently, the Government of Italy made a contentious without prejudice offer of ₹1 crore (equivalent to ₹1.9 crore or US$200,000 in 2023) to the victim's relatives. This was later objected to by the Supreme Court of India on 30 April 2013 which stated that it was "a challenge to the Indian judicial system, this is impermissible [and was] most unfortunate". The following month, Italy clarified that the offer was not compensation in relation to the ongoing proceedings but "by way of compensation in the proceedings initiated by them but by way of goodwill and gesture" and would be prevented from precluding claims by virtue of Article 142 of the Constitution of India.

== Court proceedings ==
On 23 February 2012, the Kerala High Court admitted the petition filed by the Italian Consul General in Mumbai and the marines to stay further proceedings. The petition submitted that Kerala Police had no authority to conduct an investigation in the case and that courts in India had no jurisdiction as the incident had occurred beyond Indian territorial waters. In response, the court granted one week's time to Kerala state and Central government in Delhi to file counter affidavits. On the same day, the Sessions Court in Kollam, extended by another week the police custody of the marines charged with shooting death of two fishermen. The Kerala High Court also advised the Italian government and its two navy marines to cooperate with the ongoing investigation in response to the petition filed on 21 February seeking a stay on proceeding and quashing of the FIR.

On 4 September 2012, the Indian Supreme Court heard a petition filed on behalf of the marines seeking to quash court proceedings in Kerala on the basis that they were entitled to functional immunity. In response, India rejected immunity, citing the lack of any international treaty regarding immunity from prosecution for Vessel Protection Detachments (VPD) on board privately owned merchant vessels. Further, Italy argued that as the incident occurred within India's Contiguous Zone, India lacked jurisdiction. Despite the limits set out in UNCLOS, India relied on customary international law to assert jurisdiction, leading one academic commentator to note that "India wants to press its maritime sovereignty to the limit through an intersection of UNCLOS grants and readings of its own statutes". On 18 January 2013, the Supreme Court dismissed the Italian Government's argument. Justice Chelameshwar was "of the opinion that sovereignty is not 'given' but it is only asserted. No doubt, under the Maritime Zones Act, Parliament expressly asserted sovereignty of this country over the territorial waters but simultaneously, asserted its authority to determine/alter the limit of the territorial waters". This finding meant that under Indian law India's contiguous zone could be treated as part of India's territorial waters, effectively granting India a territorial sea of 24 nautical miles, although it was entitled to only a 12 nautical mile territorial sea under international law. The Supreme Court found that the Kerala did not have jurisdiction beyond the 12 nautical mile limit and that a special federal court must be established to try the marines.

== Diplomacy ==
=== Between India and Italy ===
On 16 February 2012, the Italian ambassador in Delhi, Giacomo Sanfelice di Monteforte, was summoned to the Indian Ministry of External Affairs where an official protest was lodged. The next day, then-Indian External Affairs Minister S. M. Krishna informed the Italian Foreign Minister that the fishermen were unarmed and posed no threat. The filing of murder charges against the marines by the SIT on 18 May 2012 prompted Italy to recall its ambassador. In December 2012, the Indian Ambassador was summoned to the Italian Foreign Ministry and informed of Italy's "strong disappointment and profound bitterness" with the Indian Supreme Court on the question of jurisdiction. In addition, Terzi and Deputy Foreign Minister Staffan De Mistura mentioned that legal and political-diplomatic initiatives would be initiated. Italian media reports claimed that Italy might pursue India in the International Court of Justice.

On 11 March 2013, a dispute erupted after Italy reneged on its promise to return the marines to India. The Italian Prime Minister later reversed this decision. According to Italian Prime-Minister Mario Monti: "The government decided, also in the interests of the marines, to maintain the commitment taken when they were granted leave to take part in the elections to return to India by 22 March". Italian and Indian officials hinted that the marines, if convicted, could serve the rest of their jail term in Italy under provisions of a bilateral prisoner exchange treaty.

On 20 February 2014, the Italian authorities were informed that a live bullet was found in the mailbox of the Indian Embassy in Rome. India demanded that Italy guarantee the safety of its embassy staff in compliance with the Vienna Convention on Diplomatic Relations.

On 24 April 2014, Italian Foreign Minister Federica Mogherini told the Italian legislature that unless India cooperated by negotiating an end to the case, Italy would seek international arbitration. On 4 June 2014, India's Minister for External Affairs Sushma Swaraj argued Mogherini's proposal would amount to political interference in matters before Indian courts.

=== Inter-governmental organisations ===
==== United Nations ====
On 11 February 2014, UN Secretary-General Ban Ki-moon stated that the issue should be addressed "bilaterally, rather than with the involvement of the United Nations". Spokesperson Martin Nesirky added that the Secretary-General was concerned that the ongoing dispute remained unresolved and was creating tensions between India and Italy and was "concerned that the matter may have implications for wider common efforts and collaboration around matters of international peace and security, including anti-piracy operations." On 12 February 2014, the Italian Foreign Minister criticised the stance of the Secretary-General informing the Italian legislature it was "simply taking the middle ground ... ignoring two sides' arguments". On 6 January 2015, a few days before his visit to India, the Secretary-General conveyed his concern that the ongoing dispute continued to sharpen tensions and that Italy and India should seek "a reasonable and mutually acceptable solution". The UN High Commissioner for Human Rights expressed concern regarding the "respect of human rights" of the marines.

==== NATO ====
On 12 February 2014, the NATO Secretary-General responded to a question from an Italian journalist: "Q: Secretary General, as you know, two Italian marines are held in India since two years. And they are prosecuted under the anti-piracy and anti-terrorism law, according to Lady Catherine Ashton and the Italian Foreign Minister Emma Bonino, this implies that Italy is a terrorist state. And how can such an accusation affect the international operations for anti-piracy and generally speaking the Italian nation abroad?". Available transcripts of EU High Representative Catherine Ashton's statements do not give reason to the journalist's allegation that she had endorsed the Italian view that it had been equated to a terrorist state by India. Anders Fogh Rasmussen responded in his personal capacity: "I am, personally, very concerned about the situation of the two Italian sailors. I'm also concerned by the suggestion that they could be tried for terrorism offences. This could have possible negative implications for the international fight against piracy. A fight which is in all our interest! So I trust that we will see an appropriate resolution soon."

==== European Union (EU) ====
On 10 February 2014 Ashton informed the EU Foreign Relations Council that she was concerned that the marines were to be charged under anti-piracy laws and that it would have "huge implications" for Europe's fight against piracy. "Having said that, I've also made it clear to my dear friend Emma Bonino, to the Italian government, and to the members of the EU, that the EU remains very steadfast in our support to get this resolved in a straightforward manner quickly, and that two years is a very long time for us to see this drag on and that is the point I've made on numerous occasions." The EUHRVP also added: "A lot of the work on this, you'll understand, is done quietly—for good reasons."

On 17 December 2014, the EU's foreign policy chief Federica Mogherini expressed her disappointment over the Indian Supreme Court's decision and warned that the issue could impact EU-India relations. "The decision to deny the plea of Massimiliano Latorre for an extension of his stay in Italy for medical treatment and to refuse Salvatore Girone permission to spend the Christmas period at home is disappointing, as a long-awaited mutually agreed solution has not yet proved possible," said Mogherini, a former Italian foreign minister, in a statement. "The situation of these two European military personnel has been pending for almost three years now. The EU has consistently called for a mutually agreeable solution, in the interest of both Italy and India, based on international law. The issue has the potential to impact the overall European Union-India relations and has also a bearing on the global fight against piracy, to which the EU is strongly committed," she stated.

On 14 January 2015, European MEPs appealed to the Italian government not to forget the victims of the incident and urged Mogherini not to hold the wider economic interests of European member states hostage to the bilateral dispute between Italy and India. The European Parliament passed a non-binding resolution calling for a rapid resolution to the case within the rules of International Law and Human Rights. The stalled EU-India free trade agreement prevented Italy from gaining political leverage through trade negotiations.

The incident was cited as a reason for the delay in the EU-India summit. Cesare Onestini, the chargé d'Affaires of the Delegation of the European Union to India, said: "No date has been formally proposed to the Indian side." Strained relations with the European Union's High Representative for External Affairs who was also the former Italian foreign minister, Federica Mogherini, led to the cancellation of a visit to Brussels to meet with the new leadership of the Institutions of the European Union. Mogherini told the European Parliament in January 2015 that "it's good for everyone to be fully aware of how much of an impact the unresolved dispute of the two Italian Navy officials can have on relations between the EU and India. It is putting them to the test".

In January 2015, India criticised an EU proposal to submit the dispute to international arbitration.

== International arbitration ==
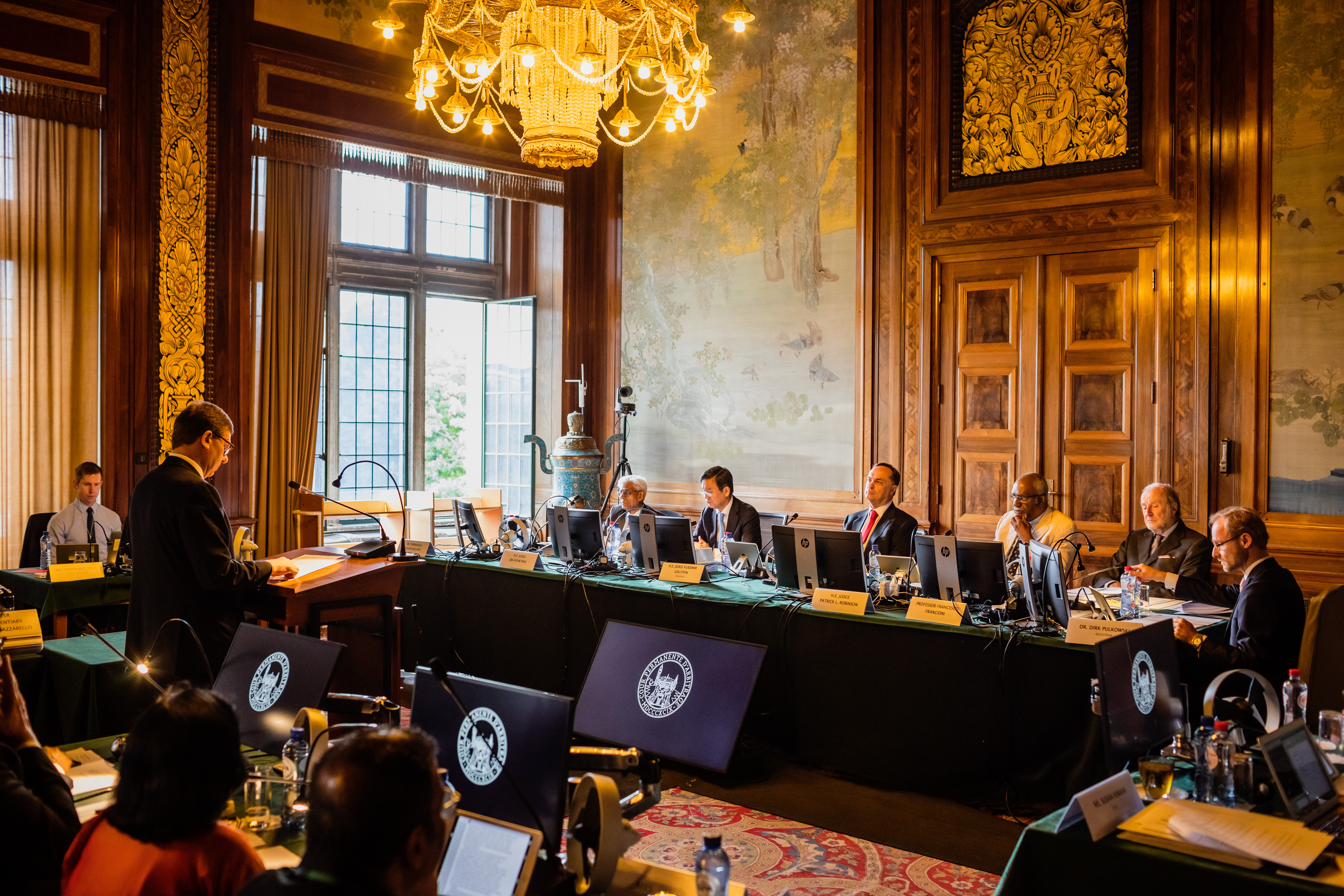
Public Hearing in PCA Case No. 2015-28

On 26 June 2015, Italy submitted the dispute to Annex VII, pursuant to UNCLOS. Additionally, on 21 July 2015, the Italian Government sought provisional measures before the International Tribunal for the Law of the Sea (ITLOS). Italy asked that: "India shall refrain from taking or enforcing any judicial or administrative measures against Sergeant Massimiliano Latorre and Sergeant Salvatore Girone in connection with the Enrica Lexie Incident, and from exercising any other form of jurisdiction over the Enrica Lexie Incident [and that] India shall take all measures necessary to ensure that restrictions on the liberty, security and movement of the Marines be immediately lifted to enable Sergeant Girone to travel to and remain in Italy and Sergeant Latorre to remain in Italy throughout the duration of the proceedings before the Annex VII Tribunal." Italy argued that these proposed measures were required to retain the status quo pending the Annex 7 hearings. The application for provisional measures was opposed by the Indian Government.

On 24 August 2015, ITLOS by a majority opinion of 15:6 issued provisional measures in the case and ordered that "Italy and India shall both suspend all court proceedings and refrain from initiating new ones which might aggravate or extend the dispute submitted to the Annex VII arbitral tribunal or might jeopardise or prejudice the carrying out of any decision which the arbitral tribunal may render", The provisional ruling demanded that India and Italy each submit to ITLOS by 24 September 2015 their respective Initial Report on the incident. ITLOS rejected Italy's request that India provisionally release the marines, "because that touches upon issues related to the merits of the case". The ITLOS decision meant neither side got precisely what it wanted. In particular, UNCLOS moved somewhat from the more interventionist approach taken in the Arctic Sunrise case, when the Tribunal ordered a state to return a person subject to Annex 7 proceedings.

On 2 July 2020, a tribunal in the Permanent Court of Arbitration, chaired by Judge Vladimir Golitsyn, ruled that the marines were entitled to immunity in relation to the acts that they committed during the incident, and that India is precluded from exercising its jurisdiction over them; that India must take the necessary steps to cease to exercise its criminal jurisdiction; and that no other remedies are required; that India is entitled to payment of compensation in connection with loss of life, physical harm, material damage to property (including to the "St. Antony") and moral harm suffered by the captain and other crew members.

== Related developments ==
In June 2014, before the start of the 2014 FIFA World Cup, the Italian Football Federation released two official blue T-shirts printed with the marines' names, to express the Federation's support for them.

Ferrari was criticised after it displayed Italian Navy ensigns on F1 cars competing at the 2012 Indian Grand Prix. A company statement read "Ferrari will carry the flag of the Italian Navy on the cars driven by Fernando Alonso and Felipe Massa [to pay] tribute to one of the outstanding entities of our country, also in the hope that the Indian and Italian authorities will soon find a solution to the situation currently involving two sailors from the Italian Navy." A spokesperson for the Indian Ministry of External Affairs spokesperson noted that the use of "sporting events to promote a cause which is not of a sporting nature and one which is sub judice is not in keeping with the spirit of sport".

Finally, in June 2021, India's Supreme court closed the case.

== Bibliography ==
- Capuozzo, Toni (2015). Il segreto dei marò (in Italian). Milano, Italy: Mursia. pp. 284 pages. ISBN 9788842556138.
