= Sergio Romano (writer) =

Italian diplomat, writer, journalist, and historian (born 1929)

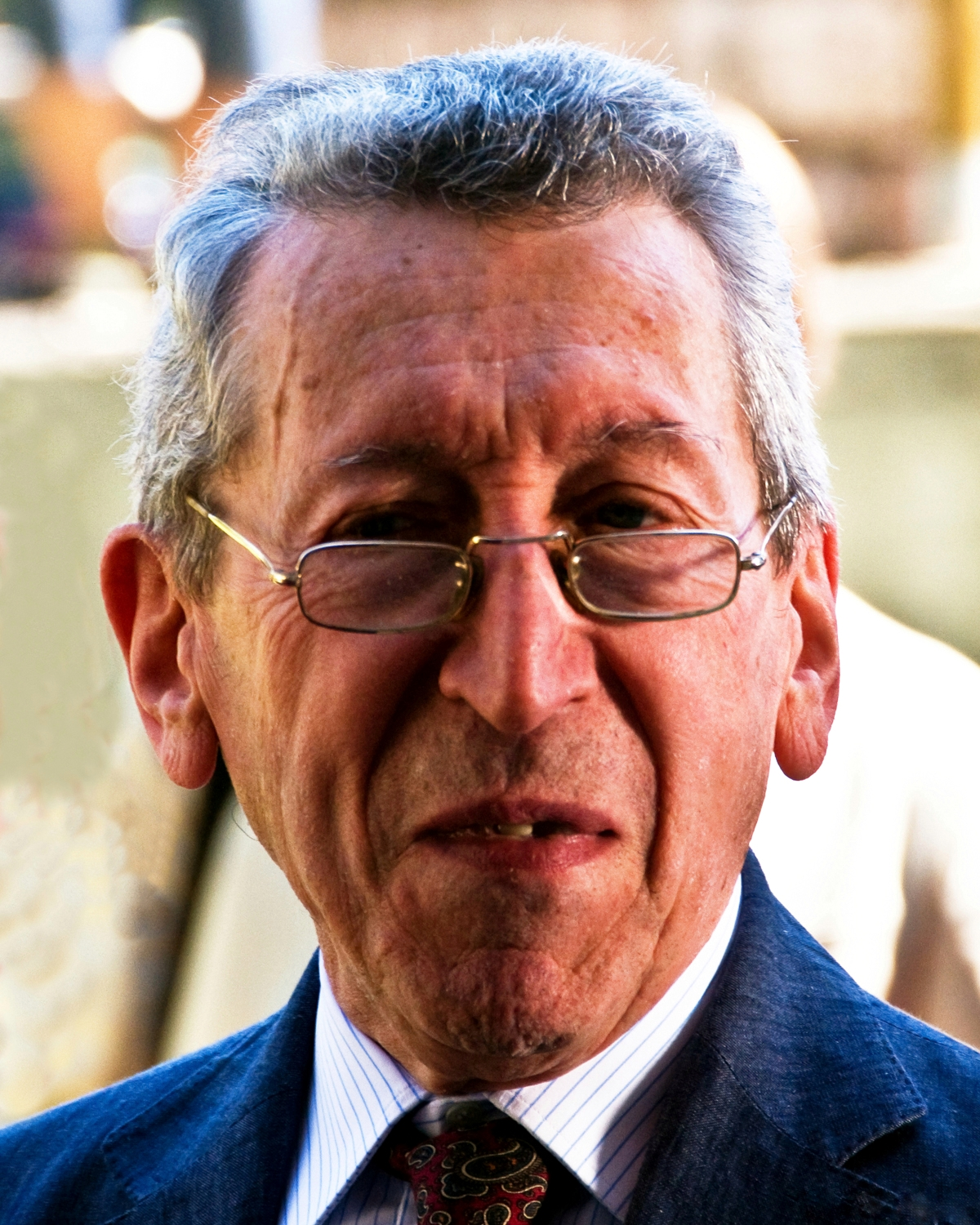
- Romano in 2008
- Born: 7 July 1929 (age 97); Vicenza, Kingdom of Italy
- Education: University of Milan
- Occupations: Diplomat; historian

Sergio Romano (born 7 July 1929) is an Italian diplomat, writer, journalist, and historian. He is a columnist for the newspaper Corriere della Sera. Romano is also a former Italian ambassador to Moscow.

== Biography ==
Born in Vicenza, he grew up between Milan and Genoa in a middle-class business family. He graduated from the liceo classico Cesare Beccaria of Milan, then began working as a journalist. In 1952, he obtained a degree in Law at the University of Milan, but he never finished his studies in Political Science at the University of Genoa before graduation. He travelled to European capitals (Paris, London, and Vienna) recently emerged from the war, which directed him to a diplomatic career. He joined the Foreign Ministry in 1954, and after four years spent in Rome he was assigned to the seat in London, where he remained until 1964. He returned to Rome to assist in the Cabinet Minister Saragat; when the latter was elected President of the Republic he followed him to the Quirinal Palace, assigned to the General Secretariat of the Presidency.

From 1968 to 1977, he was in Paris and, after being general manager of cultural relations and Ambassador to NATO (1983–85), he concluded his diplomatic career in Moscow, in the then Soviet Union. He talks about this experience in the book Memoirs of a Conservative (2002), concise portrait of the bureaucratic class and Italian diplomacy (and not only) in the era of the Cold War.

He became a commentator for a number of Italian newspapers and magazines (La Stampa, Corriere della Sera, Limes, Il Mulino), the editor of a historical series for the publisher Corbaccio. He has also taught at the University of California, Harvard University, the University of Pavia, University of Sassari and Bocconi University in Milan. He is also President of the General Prize Committee of the Balzan Foundation and a member of the Scientific Committee for the magazine Geopolitica.

In 1993, he won the "Pisa National Literary Prize" in the non-fiction section. In 2010, he won the prize "È giornalismo", when he affirmed that he had been ambassador for years without having a bachelor's degree in Political Science but only in Law (to enter the diplomatic service in Italy is required a degree in Political Sciences or in Law or in Economics). In 2010, he spoke at the 2010 Ambrosetti Forum.

== Honours ==
Order of Merit of the Italian Republic 1st Class / Knight Grand Cross – 27 December 1987

== Publications ==
- 1977 – Histoire de l'Italie du Risorgimento à nos jours (Editions du Seuil; ed. it. Storia d'Italia dal Risorgimento ai giorni nostri, Mondadori, 1978)
- 1977 – "La quarta sponda. La guerra di Libia, 1911/1912", Casa Editrice Bompiani, 1977, p. 270
- 1979 – "Giuseppe Volpi. Industria e finanza tra Giolitti e Mussolini", 1979
- 1989 – La Russia in bilico (Il Mulino)
- 1991 – La politica estera italiana (1860-1985), scritto con Richard J.B. Bosworth (Il Mulino, ISBN 88-15-02979-6)
- 1991 – Disegno di storia d'Europa dal 1789 al 1989 (Longanesi, ISBN 88-304-1042-X)
- 1992 – I falsi protocolli. Il "complotto ebraico" dalla Russia di Nicola II a oggi (Corbaccio, ISBN 88-7972-018-X)
- 1993 – L'Italia scappata di mano (Longanesi, ISBN 88-304-1170-1)
- 1993 – Viaggi intorno alla Russia (La Stampa, ISBN 88-7783-063-8)
- 1994 – Tra due Repubbliche. L'anno di Berlusconi e le prospettive dell'Italia (Arnoldo Mondadori Editore, ISBN 88-04-39713-6)
- 1994 – FINIS ITALIAE – Declino e morte dell'ideologia risorgimentale – Perché gli italiani si disprezzano (All'insegna del pesce d'oro, ISBN 88-444-1283-7)
- 1995 – Lo scambio ineguale. Italia e Stati Uniti da Wilson a Clinton (Laterza, ISBN 88-420-4734-1)
- 1995 – La storia sul comodino. Personaggi, viaggi, memorie (Greco e Greco, ISBN 88-7980-081-7)
- 1995 – Storia d'Italia dall'Unità ai nostri giorni
- 1995 – Cinquant'anni di storia mondiale. La pace e le guerre da Yalta ai giorni nostri (Longanesi, ISBN 88-304-1269-4)
- 1995 – I falsi protocolli. Il "complotto ebraico" dalla Russia di Nicola II ai nostri giorni (Nuova edizione con l'aggiunta di un capitolo sugli ebrei invisibili dell'Europa centrorientale), Editrice TEA, Milano (ed. 2008: ISBN 978-88-7818-548-7)
- 1996 – Le Italie parallele. Perché l'Italia non riesce a diventare un paese moderno (Longanesi, ISBN 88-304-1387-9)
- 1996 – Passando a Nord-Ovest, scritto con Aldo A. Mola (Bastogi, ISBN 88-8185-022-2)
- 1997 – Lettera a un amico ebreo (TEA, ISBN 88-502-0598-8)
- 1997 – Giuseppe Volpi. Industria e finanza tra Giolitti e Mussolini (Marsilio, ISBN 88-317-6774-7)
- 1998 – Confessioni di un revisionista (Ponte alle Grazie, ISBN 88-7928-448-7)
- 1998 – Storia d'Italia dal Risorgimento ai nostri giorni (TEA, ISBN 88-7818-780-1)
- 1999 – Attraverso il secolo (Libri Scheiwiller, ISBN 88-7644-264-2)
- 2000 – Giolitti (Bompiani, ISBN 88-452-1383-8)
- 2000 – L'Italia negli anni della Guerra Fredda. Dal piano Marshall alla caduta del Muro (Ponte alle Grazie, ISBN 88-7928-522-X)
- 2000 – Mussolini (biografia per immagini) (Longanesi, ISBN 88-304-1667-3)
- 2000 – I luoghi della Storia (Rizzoli, ISBN 88-17-12543-1)
- 2000 – Crispi (Bompiani, ISBN 88-452-1283-1; ristampa)
- 2001 – I volti della storia. I protagonisti e le questioni aperte del nostro passato (Rizzoli, ISBN 88-17-10669-0)
- 2001 – La pace perduta 1989-2001 (Longanesi, ISBN 88-304-1973-7)
- 2002 – Lettera a un amico ebreo. Edizione ampliata (Longanesi, ISBN 88-304-2019-0)
- 2002 – Memorie di un conservatore (TEA, ISBN 88-502-0755-7)
- 2002 – Guida alla politica estera italiana. Da Badoglio a Berlusconi (Rizzoli, ISBN 88-17-00069-8)
- 2003 – I confini della storia (Rizzoli, ISBN 88-17-00794-3)
- 2003 – Il rischio americano (Longanesi, ISBN 88-304-2020-4)
- 2004 – Giovanni Gentile. Un filosofo al potere negli anni del Regime (Rizzoli, ISBN 88-17-00138-4)
- 2004 – Anatomia del terrore. Colloquio con Guido Olimpio (Rizzoli, ISBN 88-17-00405-7)
- 2004 – Europa, storia di un'idea. Dall'impero all'unione (Longanesi, ISBN 88-304-2071-9)
- 2005 – La quarta sponda: La guerra di Libia 1911-1912 (Longanesi, ISBN 88-304-2169-3; ristampa 1ª edizione Bompiani 1977)
- 2005 – Libera Chiesa. Libero Stato? (Longanesi, ISBN 88-304-2320-3)
- 2007 – Saremo moderni? Diario di un anno (Longanesi, ISBN 88-304-2340-8)
- 2007 – Con gli occhi dell'Islam (Longanesi, ISBN 978-88-304-2171-4)
- 2008 – I falsi protocolli (Editore TEA collana TEA storica)
- 2009 – Indro Montanelli. I conti con me stesso. Diari 1957-1978 (Rizzoli, ISBN 978-88-17-02820-2)
- 2009 – Storia di Francia, dalla comune a Sarkozy (Longanesi, ISBN 978-88-304-2170-7)
- 2011 – L'Italia disunita (Longanesi, ISBN 978-88-304-2744-0)
- 2012 – with Beda Romano – La Chiesa contro. Dalla sessualità all'eutanasia tutti i no all'Europa moderna (Longanesi,ISBN 978-88-304-3152-2)

== See also ==
- Ministry of Foreign Affairs (Italy)
- Foreign relations of Italy
