= Giulio Terzi di Sant'Agata =

Italian diplomat and politician (born 1946)

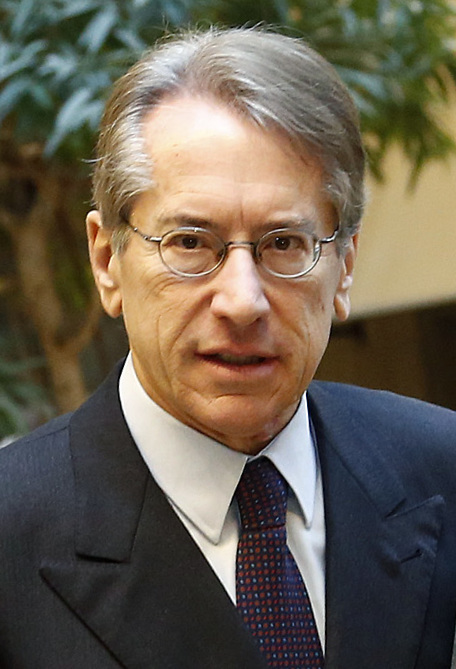
- Terzi de Sant'Agata in 2012

Minister of Foreign Affairs
- In office 16 November 2011 – 26 March 2013
- Prime Minister: Mario Monti
- Preceded by: Franco Frattini
- Succeeded by: Emma Bonino

Member of the Senate of the Republic
- Incumbent
- Assumed office 13 October 2022
- Constituency: Treviglio

Ambassador of Italy to the United States
- In office 1 October 2009 – 16 November 2011
- Preceded by: Giovanni Castellaneta
- Succeeded by: Claudio Bisogniero

Permanent Representative of Italy to the United Nations
- In office 25 August 2008 – 8 November 2009
- Preceded by: Marcello Spatafora
- Succeeded by: Cesare Ragaglini

Ambassador of Italy to Israel
- In office 2002–2004
- Preceded by: Gian Paolo Cavarai
- Succeeded by: Sandro De Bernardin

Personal details
- Born: Giuliomaria Terzi di Sant'Agata; 9 June 1946 (age 80) Bergamo, Kingdom of Italy
- Party: FdI (2013–present); PR (2017–present)
- Other political affiliations: Independent (until 2013)
- Spouse: Antonella Cinque (m. 2013)
- Children: 2
- Education: University of Milan

Giuliomaria Terzi di Sant'Agata (Italian: [ˈdʒuːljo ˈtɛrtsi di sanˈtaːɡata]; born 9 June 1946) is an Italian diplomat and politician. He was Italy's Minister of Foreign Affairs in Mario Monti's government from November 2011 until March 2013, Permanent Representative of Italy to the United Nations in New York between 2008 and 2009 and Ambassador of Italy to the United States between 2009 and 2011. He is currently a Senator of the Republic of Italy and the President of the 4th Permanent Senate Commission of EU Affairs elected from the Lombardy constituency as a part of Brothers of Italy. He is also the President of the India-Italy Parliamentary Friendship group.

== Early life and education ==
Born in a noble family from Bergamo, after the classical high school diploma obtained at the episcopal college of St. Alexander in Bergamo, Giulio Terzi earned a degree in Law at the University of Milan, specializing in international law.

== Diplomatic career ==
Terzi joined Italy's foreign service in 1973. During his first two years at the Ministry of Foreign Affairs in Rome, he served as a protocol officer assigned to visits by Italian government officials abroad. In 1975 he was posted as first secretary for political affairs at the Italian embassy in Paris. After returning to Rome in 1978, as Special Assistant to the Secretary-General, he was in Canada as Economic and Commercial Counsellor for almost five years, a period of sharp growth in economic and high-tech cooperation between Italy and Canada. He was Consul General in Vancouver during Expo 86, where he promoted major events for Italian businesses and culture on Canada's Pacific Coast.

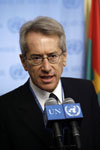
Giulio Terzi in New York

In 1987, Terzi returned to Rome to serve first at the Department for Economic Affairs, focusing on high technology exchange, and later as Head of one of the Offices of the Department of Personnel and Human Resources. His next foreign assignment was to NATO in Brussels, where he was Political Adviser to the Italian Mission to the North Atlantic Council in the immediate aftermath of the Cold War, German reunification, and the first Gulf War.

From 1993 to 1998, Terzi was in New York City at the Permanent Mission of Italy to the United Nations as First Counsellor for Political Affairs and later as Minister and Deputy Permanent Representative. During this period – marked by the Bosnian War, the Somali Civil War, as well as conflicts in the African Great Lakes region – Italy was a non-permanent member of the UN Security Council. By the mid-nineties globalisation and new challenges to international security underscored the need for major reforms of the UN bodies, a cause that Italy championed in all the UN fora. Terzi served as deputy secretary-general of Italy's Ministry of Foreign Affairs in Rome, director-general for political affairs and human rights, and political director. In this capacity, his responsibilities included major international security and political issues, especially in the framework of the UN Security Council, the UN General Assembly, and the United Nations Human Rights Council, as well as the Council of the European Union, NATO, the G8, and OSCE. He also advised the Foreign Minister on international security, focusing on the Western Balkans, the Middle East, Afghanistan, East Africa, nuclear proliferation, terrorism, and human rights.

His most recent overseas posting was ambassador of Italy to Israel (2002–2004), a period characterized by the outbreak of the Second Intifada, improved relations between the EU and Israel during the Italian Presidency of the EU (July–December 2003), and the renewed commitment of Israel and the Palestinian Authority to the peace process.

From 20 August 2008 to 30 September 2009, Terzi was Italy's permanent representative to the United Nations in New York, where he led the Italian delegation to the UN Security Council during the last year of the Italian biennium as a non-permanent member (2007–2008).

From 8 October 2009 to 16 November 2011 Terzi was Ambassador to the United States in Washington DC.

== Foreign minister ==
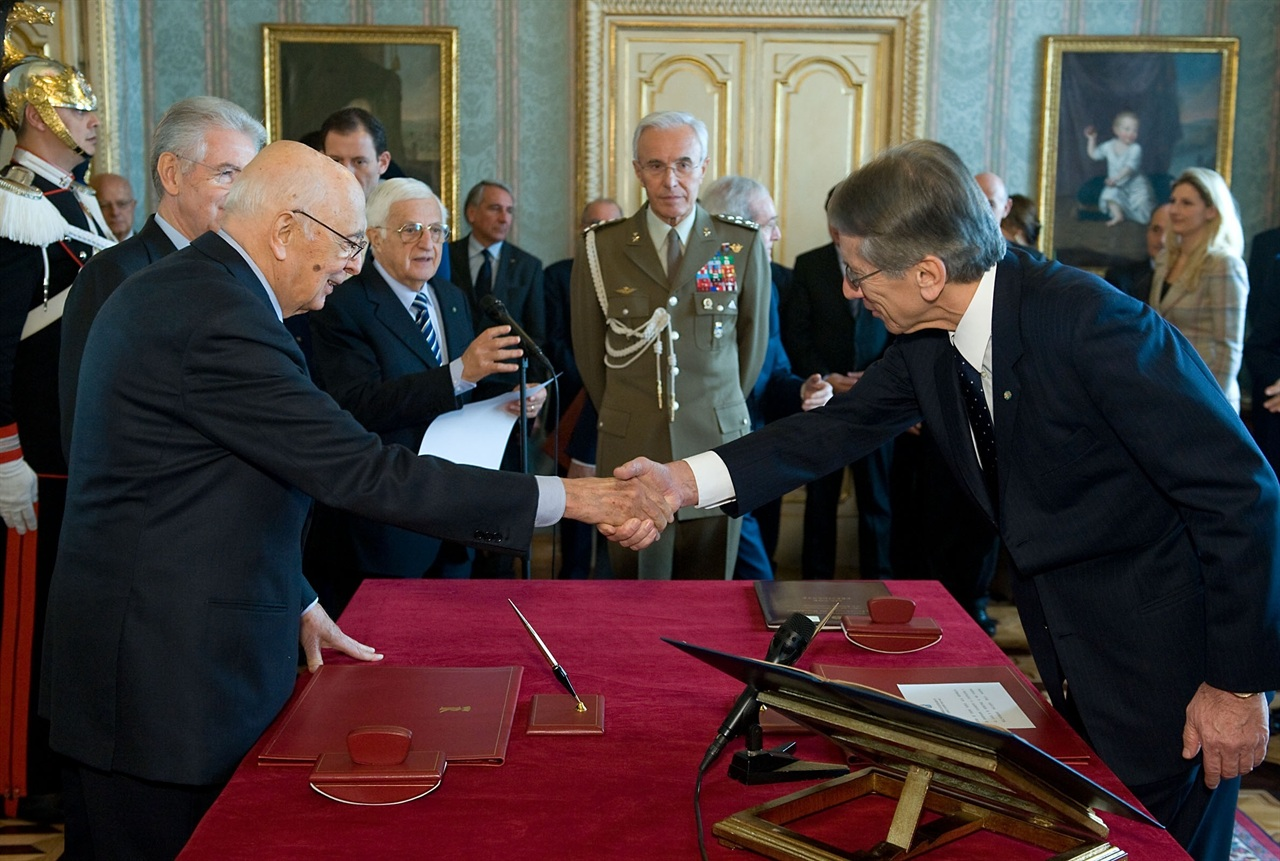
Terzi's pledge as Foreign Minister on 17 November 2011

On 16 November 2011 Terzi was appointed Minister of Foreign Affairs in the technocratic cabinet headed by Prime Minister Mario Monti.

During his tenure, he held 1,483 meetings and events, which covered 91 different countries with 75 official visits abroad and 138 meetings with other foreign ministers, of which 63 in Italy and 75 overseas. He was member of the "Westervelle Group", composed by 11 European Foreign Ministers and aimed at supporting initiatives for "More Europe" in the European political integration process. He actively promoted UN moratorium on the death penalty resolution and other campaigns for human rights and fundamental freedoms.

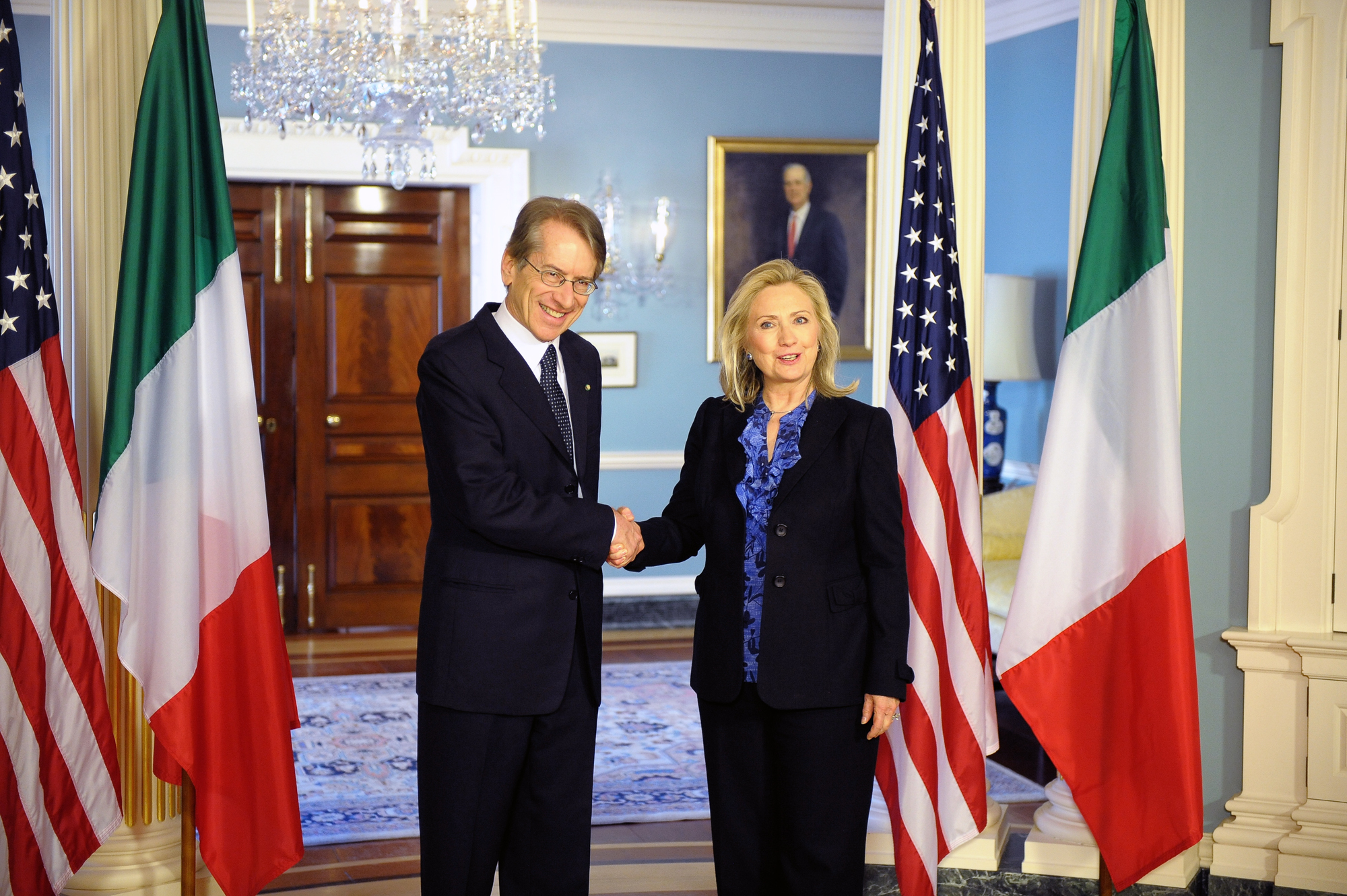
Foreign Affairs Minister Giulio Terzi with State secretary Hillary Clinton

Within the EU and NATO, Minister Terzi was a strong advocate for a renewed "Pratica di Mare" partnership with the Russian Federation in order to settle energy and rule of law issues, as well as European security concerns raised from east–west diverging positions on conventional and nuclear forces. He gave impulse to policies of diversification of energy supplies to Italy, by negotiating and signing during the 2012 UNGA in New York the Memorandum of Understanding (MoU) for the Trans Adriatic Pipeline (TAP) between Albania, Greece and Italy, by strengthening relations with transitional governments in Libya, and enhancing economic cooperation with Mozambique, Angola and Algeria. He pursued a reinforced Mediterranean political and economic cooperation in the Mediterranean region in the "5+5 Dialogue" framework, with Spain, France, Italy, Malta, Portugal, Libya, Morocco, Mauritania and Tunisia, and other bilateral and multilateral initiatives through the EU, NATO and the UN. At the same time, Minister Terzi did strive for a closer EU political, economic, and scientific cooperation with Israel and for the reactivation of the peace process on the basis of the two-state solution. During his tenure, Minister Terzi engaged in a more active Italian diplomacy for the Horn of Africa, by visiting and signing new agreements with Ethiopia and Somalia.

=== Diplomatic crisis with India and resignation ===
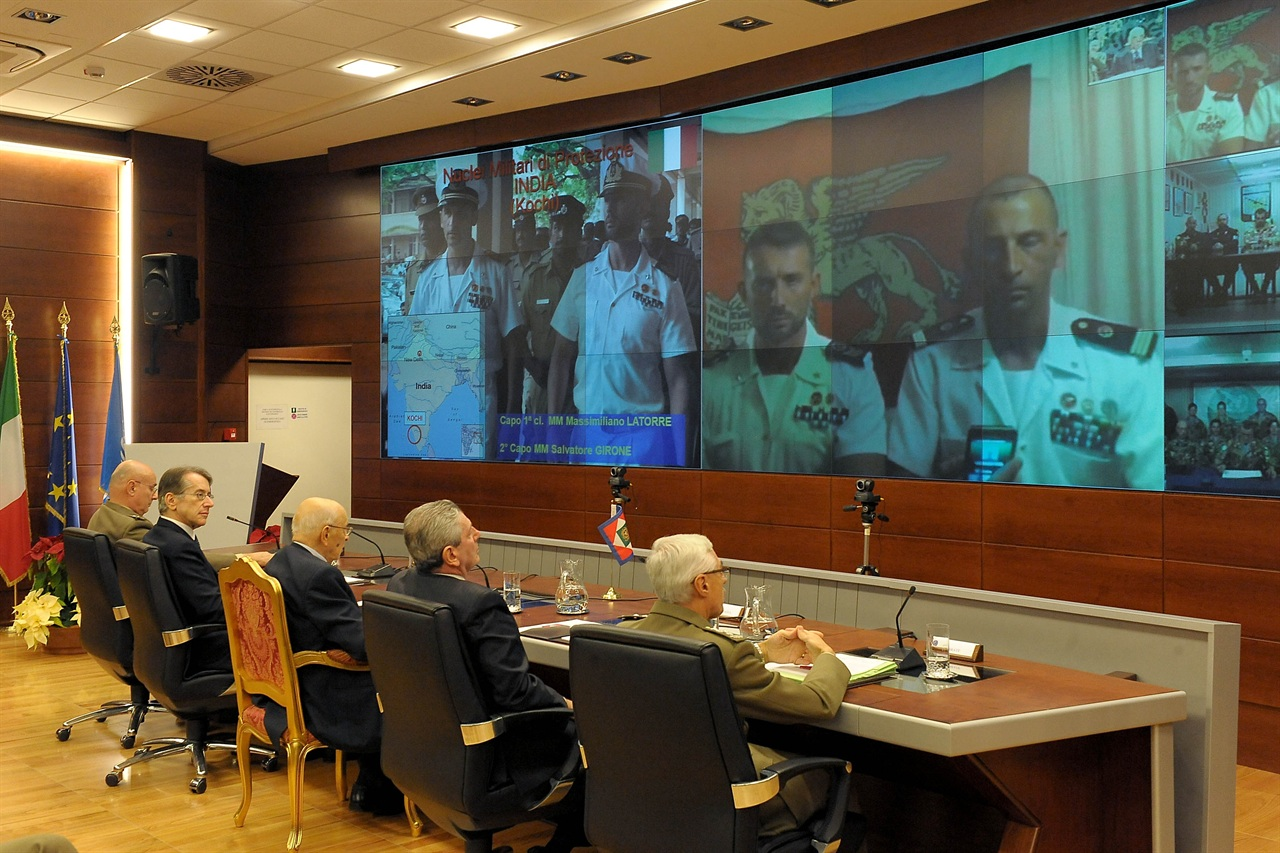
Italian President Giorgio Napolitano and Foreign Minister Terzi in VTC with the two marò on 20 December 2012.

The seizure by India of two Italian marines (marò) in international waters off the Kerala coast on 16 February 2012 over an alleged incident and the shooting deaths of two fishermen which India claimed had involved the Italian tanker Enrica Lexie and its Military Protection Unit, while on official duty in the framework of international anti-piracy activities, caused a dispute between India and Italy on jurisdiction.

The dispute was brought by the Italian Government to the UN, EU, regional and global fora, and discussed at bilateral and multilateral levels with India, with the intent of settling the dispute through the arbitration procedure established by the United Nations Convention on the Law of the Sea (UNCLOS), to which both Italy and India are signatories. Having India formally rejected all Italian proposals for convening UNCLOS Arbitration, Terzi on 11 March 2013 announced – on behalf of and in agreement with the government – that the two Italian marines, Massimiliano Latorre and Salvatore Girone – who had meanwhile been sent back to Italy having obtained from the Indian authorities a "temporary leave" to exert their electoral duties – would not have left the country to return to India until the arbitration established by UNCLOS decided on the matter of jurisdiction.

The Indian reaction leads to growing tensions until on 21 March the Prime Minister's Office reversed Terzi's policy and announced the decision to send the two back to India. Such a sudden change in the government's strategy was severely criticized and rejected formally in writing by Terzi. While Terzi was waiting for clarifications from the PM Monti, he clarified that he had no intention to resign.

Three days later, on 26 March 2013 – as soon as the plenary session of the Chamber of Deputies reconvened to discuss the latest developments on the case – Terzi announced in parliament his resignation because of his dissent with the position of the government which had reversed a previously agreed decision of keeping the two Marines in Italy until the UNCLOS arbitration would have deliberated on the matter of jurisdiction. The following day, PM Mario Monti assumed the interim as foreign minister. Terzi's resignation has been criticized by Monti, who told the Chamber of Deputies that Terzi had not expressed any dissent or mentioned an intention to resign. Monti strongly criticized Terzi's resignation, which he attributed to the non-effective handling of the dossier of the diplomatic dispute over the 2012 Enrica Lexie incident.

In a 27 March 2013 address to the Italian parliament, Monti revealed that Terzi repeatedly hampered efforts to settle the dispute with India in a quiet manner by perpetuating controversies through hawkish statements posted on Twitter. Monti attributed the "hardening" of India's stance to "rash" statements to the press by Terzi and concluded his parliamentary briefing on the debacle, saying that Italy's strategy "shouldn't have been the subject of premature statements to the press, which Minister Terzi decided instead to make, previewing a final result which at that point couldn't be taken for granted,". According to Monti, Terzi's resignation was aimed at achieving "other results that will soon become more evident". Terzi immediately contested Monti's innuendos publicly, reiterating in various interviews and articles reasons and facts which had led to his resignation. On 29 March 2013 Terzi unveiled during a TV interview the heavy pressures he had received in order to give his consent to the return of the two Italian marines to India. Pressures that he firmly refused, since the Marines return to India before the UNCLOS Arbitration would have infringed principles and norms enshrined in the Italian Constitution.

== Later activities ==
After the 2013 political elections, although not running himself for office, Terzi joined the right-wing Brothers of Italy - National Alliance party, and from 9 March 2014 is part of the party bureau. In 2017 Terzi announced he also joined the Radical Party, and its association Hands off Cain against death penalty.

In 2015 Terzi is appointed together with General Vincenzo Camporini to the Commission of Inquiry and Control of the High-level Group on Operation Protective Edge (Israel's 2014 war on Gaza).

Since 2016 Terzi has been a member of the advisory board and representative in Italy of the lobby United Against Nuclear Iran (UANI), President of the Global Committee for the rule of law, President of the International Relations Department of Fondazione Luigi Einaudi and President of the Italian-Kosovo Chamber of Commerce.

== Electoral history ==
Election	House	Constituency	Party	Votes	Result
2022	Senate of the Republic	Lombardy – Treviglio	FdI	240,337	Elected

== Honors ==
Order of Merit of the Italian Republic 1st Class / Knight Grand Cross – November 22, 2010

== See also ==
- Ministry of Foreign Affairs (Italy)
- Foreign relations of Italy

Diplomatic posts
Preceded by Marcello Spatafora	Permanent Representative of Italy to the United Nations; 2008–2009	Succeeded by Cesare Ragaglini
Preceded by Giovanni Castellaneta	Ambassador of Italy to the United States; 2009–2011	Succeeded by Claudio Bisogniero
Political offices
Preceded by Franco Frattini	Minister of Foreign Affairs; 2011–2013	Succeeded by Emma Bonino
