= Mariangela Zappia =

Italian diplomat (born 1959)

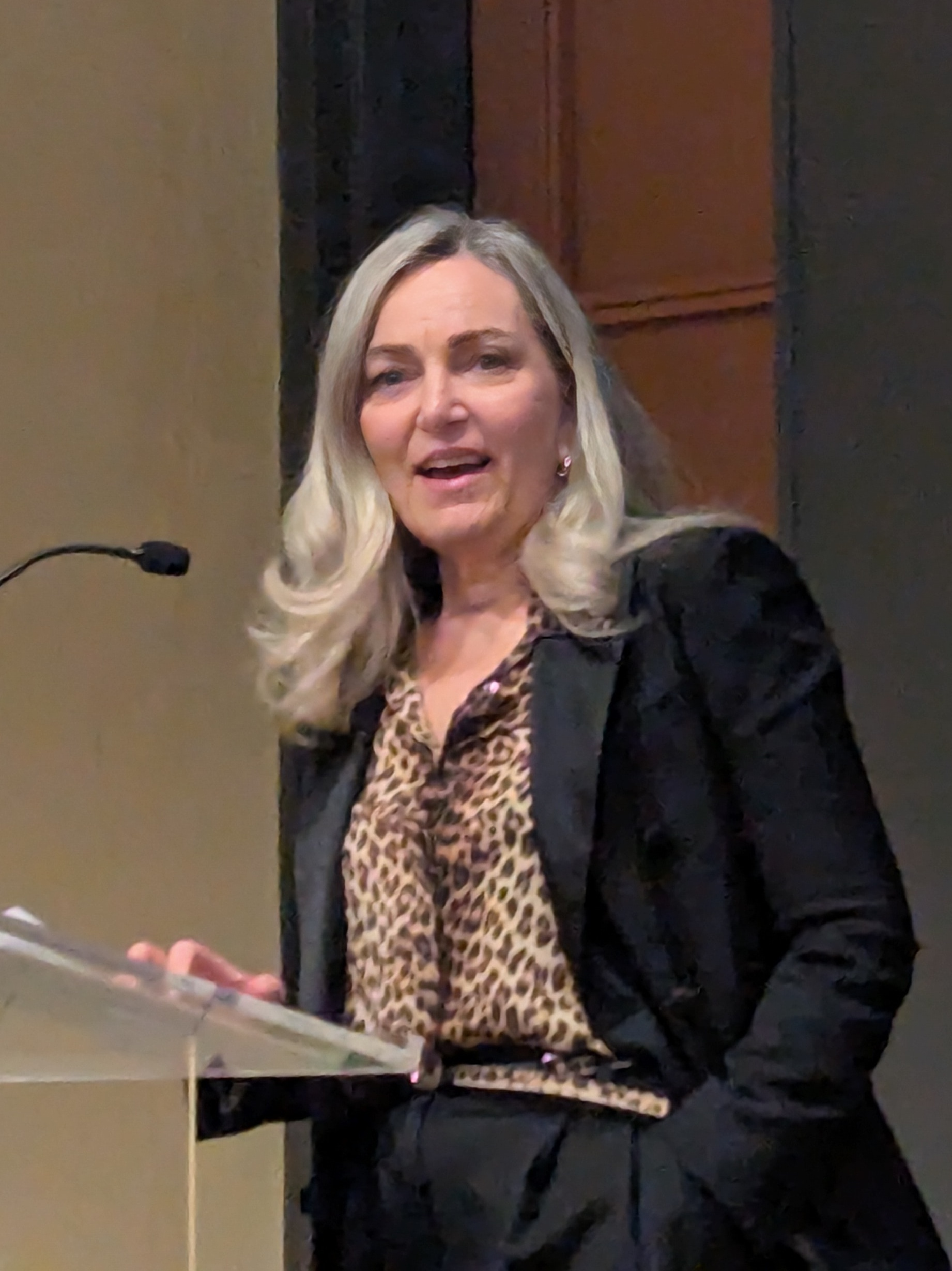
- Zappia in 2024
- Born: 12 August 1959 (age 66); Viadana, Italy
- Occupation: Diplomat
- Title: Permanent Representative of Italy to the United Nations in New York 2018; Ambassador of Italy to the United States
- Children: 2

Mariangela Zappia (born 12 August 1959) is an Italian diplomat who served as Ambassador of Italy to the United States from 2021 to 2025. She previously served as Permanent Representative of Italy to the United Nations from 2018 to 2021.

== Biography ==
Born in Viadana, she graduated in political science and international relations from the University of Florence in 1981. She holds a post-graduate degree in diplomatic and international relations from the same university.

== Diplomatic career ==
She joined the Foreign Service in 1983 when she was appointed to the Legal Service and later on to the Maghreb and Middle East Department of the Directorate General for Political Affairs. She held different positions at the Italian Embassy in Dakar (1986–1990) and at the Consulate General in New York (1990–1993). Promoted Counsellor in 1993, she was in charge of the relations with Italian press and media at the Press and Information Service and Office of the Spokesperson of the Minister of Foreign Affairs in Rome from 1994 to 1997. First Counsellor, she worked at the Italian Embassy in Brussels, then detached, on a special assignment, to the NATO media task-force during the conflict in Kosovo (1997–2000) and appointed at the Permanent Mission of Italy to the UN in New York in 2000. From 2003 to 2006 she dedicated herself full time to her family. In 2007 she became Head of the Mediterranean, the Middle East and Balkans Department for Development Cooperation at the Ministry of Foreign Affairs in Rome. Ministry Plenipotentiary at the Permanent Mission of Italy to the UN. and other International Organizations in Geneva (2007–2011), she was then appointed Head of the European Union Delegation to the UN and other International Organization in Geneva (2011–2014). From 2014 to 2016 she served as Permanent Representative of Italy to the North Atlantic Treaty Organization NATO in Brussels, becoming the first woman to hold this position. She had been the Diplomatic Advisor and G7-G20 Sherpa to the Prime Minister of Italy (2016–2018) before being appointed Permanent Representative of Italy to the United Nations in New York in August 2018. On March 12, 2021, Zappia was appointed Ambassador of Italy to the United States in Washington, D.C., by Italian prime minister Draghi.

== Publications ==
She has published on the Reform of the Security Council and on the Contribution of Italy to UN peace-keeping operations.

She is a regular speaker at international conferences on Italian Foreign policy, multilateral and global issues.

== Honours and awards ==
In 2002, she was awarded the decoration of Officer of the Order of Merit of the Italian Republic.

In 2018, she was awarded the decoration of "Commendatore" (Commander) of the Order of Merit of the Italian Republic.

She is a member of the advisory board of New York University's Casa Italiana Zerilli-Marimò and an Honorary Trustee of the Board of Trustees of the United Nations’ International School. She is also a member of the International Advisory Council of the think tank International Peace Institute.

She is an active member of the International Gender Champions Network aimed at promoting gender parity and women's participation in decision-making in all sectors.

In June 2019 she was awarded with the "Mela d’Oro" (Golden Apple), a recognition assigned by the "Fondazione Marisa Bellisario" to women who stand out for their contribution, at the national and international level, in public institutions, management, science, economy, culture, media and sport.

== See also ==
- Ministry of Foreign Affairs (Italy)
- Foreign relations of Italy
