= List of ambassadors of Italy to Germany =

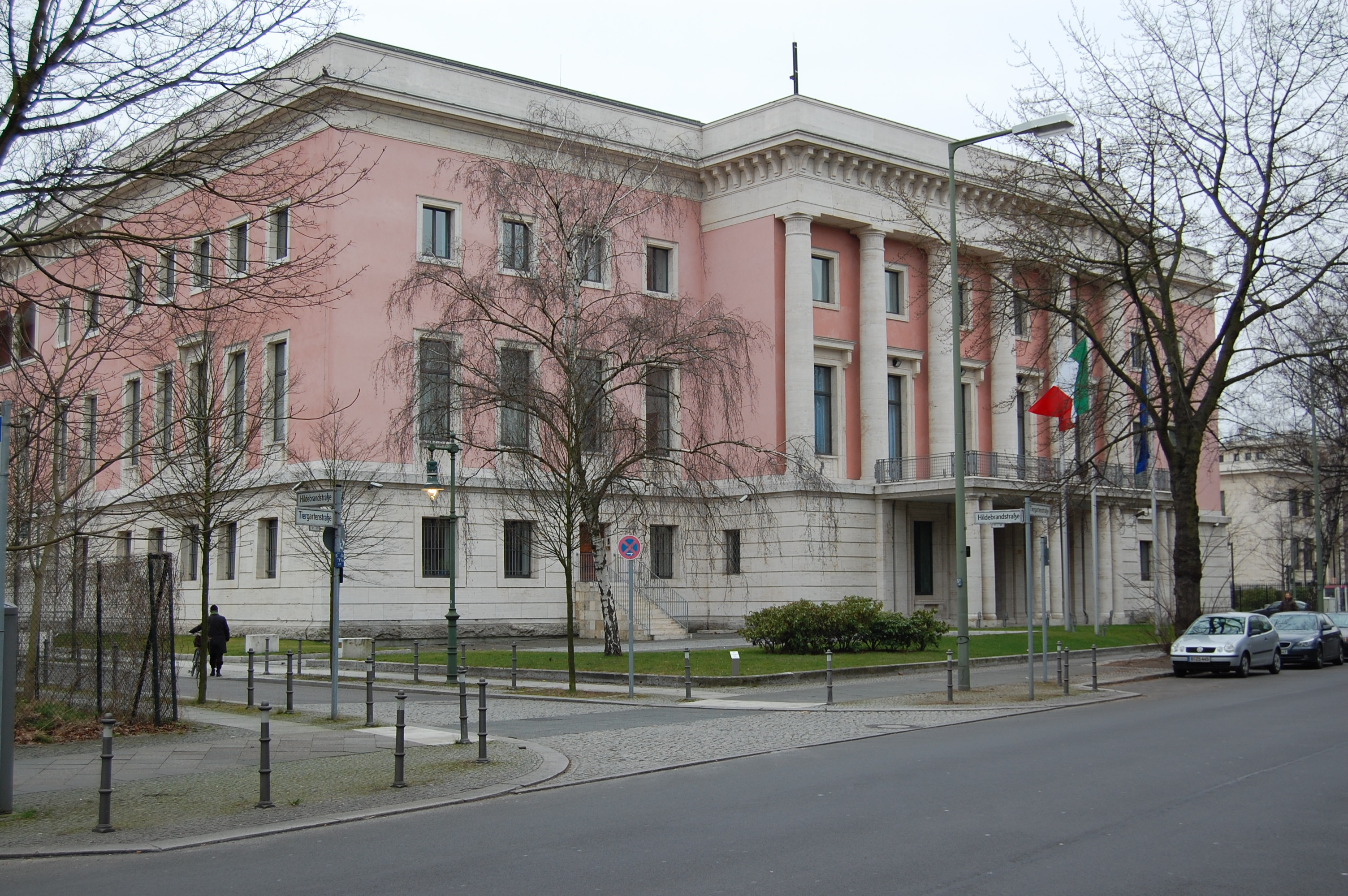
Italian embassy in Berlin

The Ambassador of the Italian Republic to Germany (Italian: Italienischer Botschafter in Deutschland) is the official representative of the government of Italy to the German government. The incumbent ambassador is Armando Varricchio, appointed on 21 June 2021. The ambassador is based at the Embassy of Italy, Berlin.

The ambassador has their offices in Berlin at 1 Hiroshimastraße.

== List ==
From	Up To	Ambassador	Notes
1871	1892	Edoardo de Launay	
1892	1906	Carlo Lanza	
1906	1912	Alberto Pansa	
1912	1915	Riccardo Bollati	
1915	1920	Interruption of diplomatic relations	World War I
1919	1920	Giacomo De Martino	
1920	1922	Alfredo Frassati	
1922	1926	Alessandro De Bosdari	
1926	1929	Luigi Aldrovandi Marescotti	
1929	1932	Luca Orsini Baroni	
1932	1935	Vittorio Cerruti	1933 : Adolf Hitler in power
1935	1940	Bernardo Attolico	
1940	1943	Dino Alfieri	member of the Blackshirts
1943	1945	Filippo Anfuso	for the Italian Social Republic.
1947	1950	Vitale Giovanni Gallina	
1950	1954	Francesco Babuscio Rizzo	Ambassador to West-Germany
1954	1958	Umberto Grazzi	
1958	1961	Pietro Quaroni	
1961	1964	Gastone Guidotti	
1964	1976	Mario Luciolli	
1976	1980	Corrado Orlandi Contucci	
1980	1987	Luigi Vittorio Ferraris	
1987	1989	Raniero Vanni d'Archirafi	
1989	1992	Marcello Guidi	German reunification
1992	1996	Umberto Vattani	
1996	2001	Enzo Perlot	
2001	2005	Silvio Fagiolo	
2005	2009	Antonio Puri Purini	
2009	2012	Michele Valensise	
2012	2014	Elio Menzione	
2014	2018	Pietro Benassi	
2018	2021	Louis Mattiolo	
2021	2025	Armando Varricchio	
2025		Fabrizio Bucci	
