= Embassy of Italy, Washington, D.C. =

Embassy

Embassy of Italy, Washington, D.C. Ambasciata d'Italia a Washington
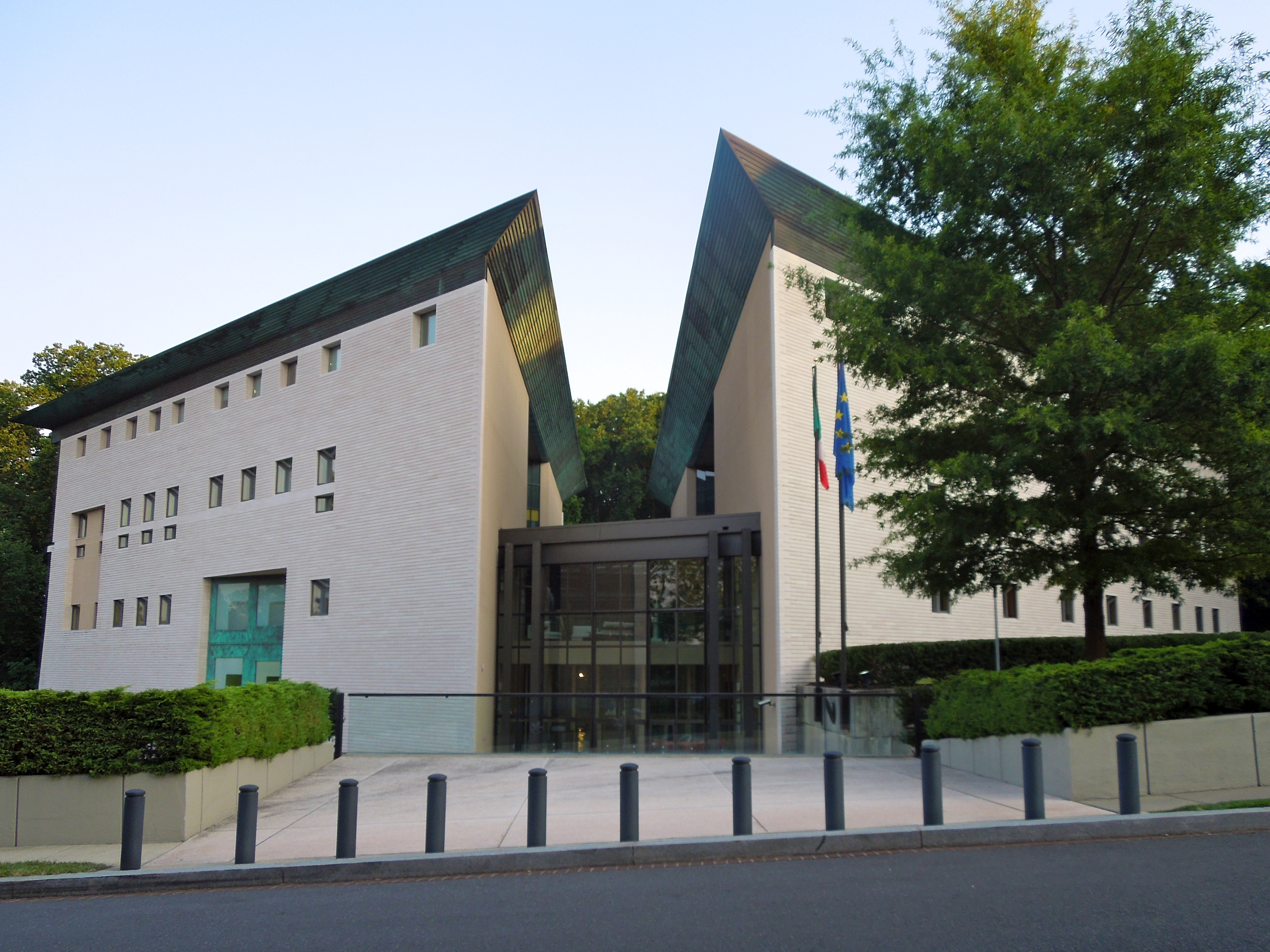
- Location: (United States) Washington, D.C.
- Address: 3000 Whitehaven Street, N.W.
- Coordinates: 38°55′4″N 77°3′37″W

The Italian Embassy in Washington, D.C. is the diplomatic mission of the Italian Republic to the United States, and the seat of the Italian Ambassador to the United States.

The original Italian diplomatic mission to the United States following Italian unification was founded by Baron Saverio Fava. The current chancery is located just off Embassy Row at 3000 Whitehaven Street, Northwest, Washington, D.C. It is accessed from the Woodley Park station on the Washington Metro. In 1972, the Italian government purchased property from the Andrew W. Mellon Foundation that was part of the campus of the neighboring Center for Hellenic Studies.

The new building was designed by Piero Sartogo, Nathalie Grenon and Susanna Nobili, and was completed in early 2000.

== Old Embassy ==
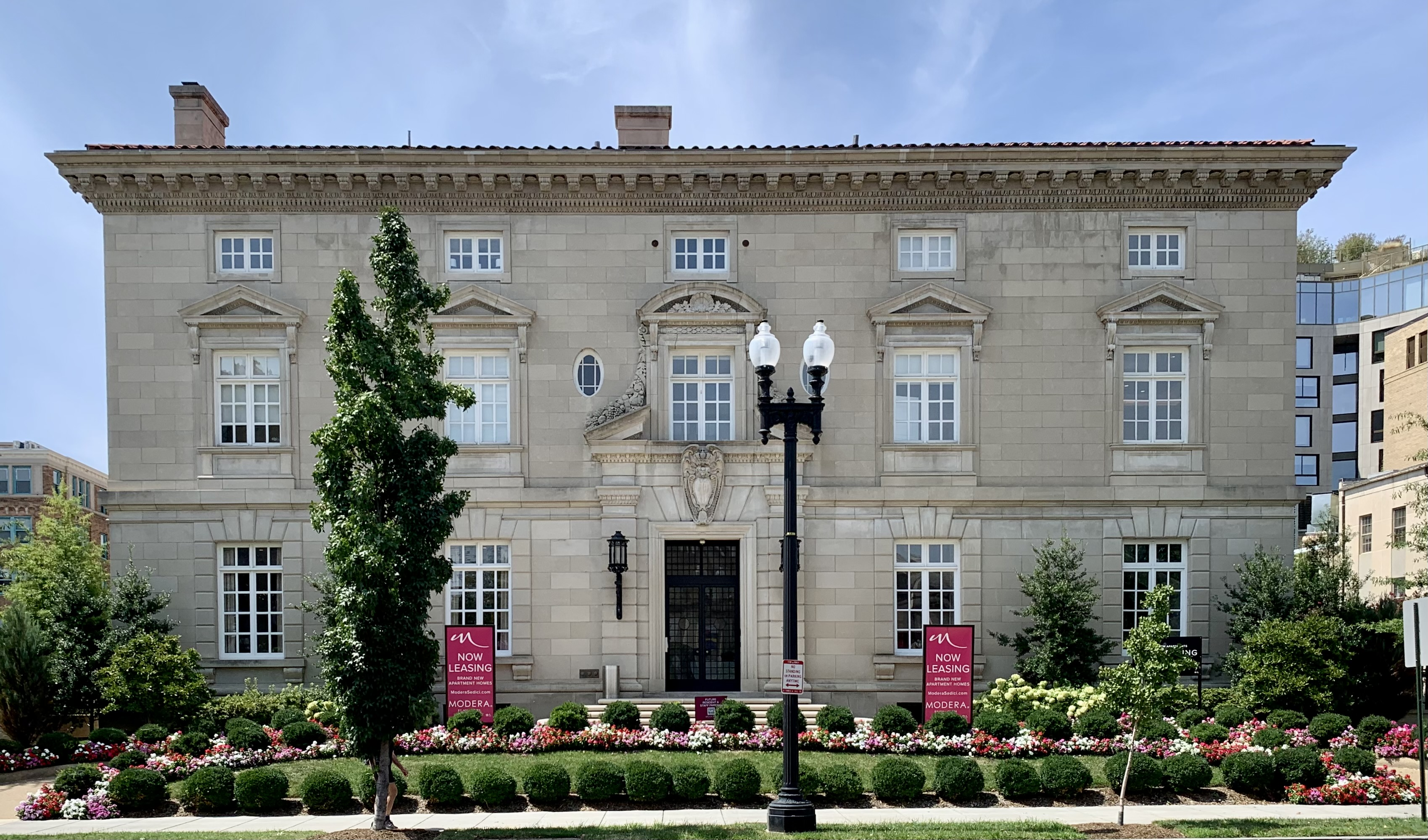
Former chancery of the Italian Embassy

Previously, the embassy had been based at 2700 16th Street and Fuller Street, in an ornate and historic, but small, facility. Several of the embassy's offices had to be based elsewhere in Washington, and it was thus decided to build a new chancery.

The Neo-Renaissance building was completed in 1925 and was designed by architects Warren and Wetmore (their designs include Grand Central Terminal in New York City). The first Italian ambassador to reside in the home was Giacomo De Martino. In 1977, Ambassador Roberto Gaja moved the residence to Villa Firenze (Firenze House) in the Forest Hills neighborhood. The 16th Street building continued to serve as the chancery until 2002, when it was purchased by developers. Their plans to convert the building into condominiums are being challenged by the city's Historic Preservation Office.

== Bibliography ==
- Gaetano Cortese (2011). The Embassy of Italy Washington (PDF). Roma: Stabilimenti Tipografici Carlo Colombo. As described in Stefano Baldi. "Libri fotografici sulle Rappresentanze diplomatiche italiane all'estero".

== See also ==
- Foreign relations of Italy
- Italian nationality law
- List of ambassadors of Italy to the United States
