= Susanna Nobili =

Italian architect and academic (1951–2026)

- Born: 20 August 1951; Rome, Italy
- Died: 16 August 2026 (aged 74); Rome, Italy
- Education: Sapienza University of Rome
- Occupations: Architect, academic
- Father: Franco Nobili

Susanna Nobili (20 August 1951 – 16 August 2026) was an Italian architect and academic. She was the daughter of executive Franco Nobili and graduated in architecture in Rome in 1976. She subsequently specialized in Paris and Vienna, and began her professional career at the studio of Pier Luigi Nervi.

Nobili worked in public and private architecture, restoration, interior design and exhibition design. Her projects included the chancelleries of the Italian Embassy in Guatemala City and the Italian Embassy in Washington, D.C., the latter designed with Piero Sartogo and Nathalie Grenon. She also worked on the Italian Pavilion at Expo '92 in Seville and on the restoration of historic buildings and monuments in Rome, including Palazzo Poli, San Michele a Ripa and Palazzo Baldassini.

From 1983 to 1992 Nobili was a councillor of the Milan Triennial. From 2008 she taught interior design at the Istituto Europeo di Design. Her exhibition work emphasized light, spatial composition and the visitor's experience. Among her projects were exhibitions devoted to Puvis de Chavannes, Il Secolo dell'Avvocato and I libri che hanno fatto l'Europa.

Nobili died in Rome on 16 August 2026, aged 74.
