= Gelasio Caetani =

Italian diplomat (1877–1934)

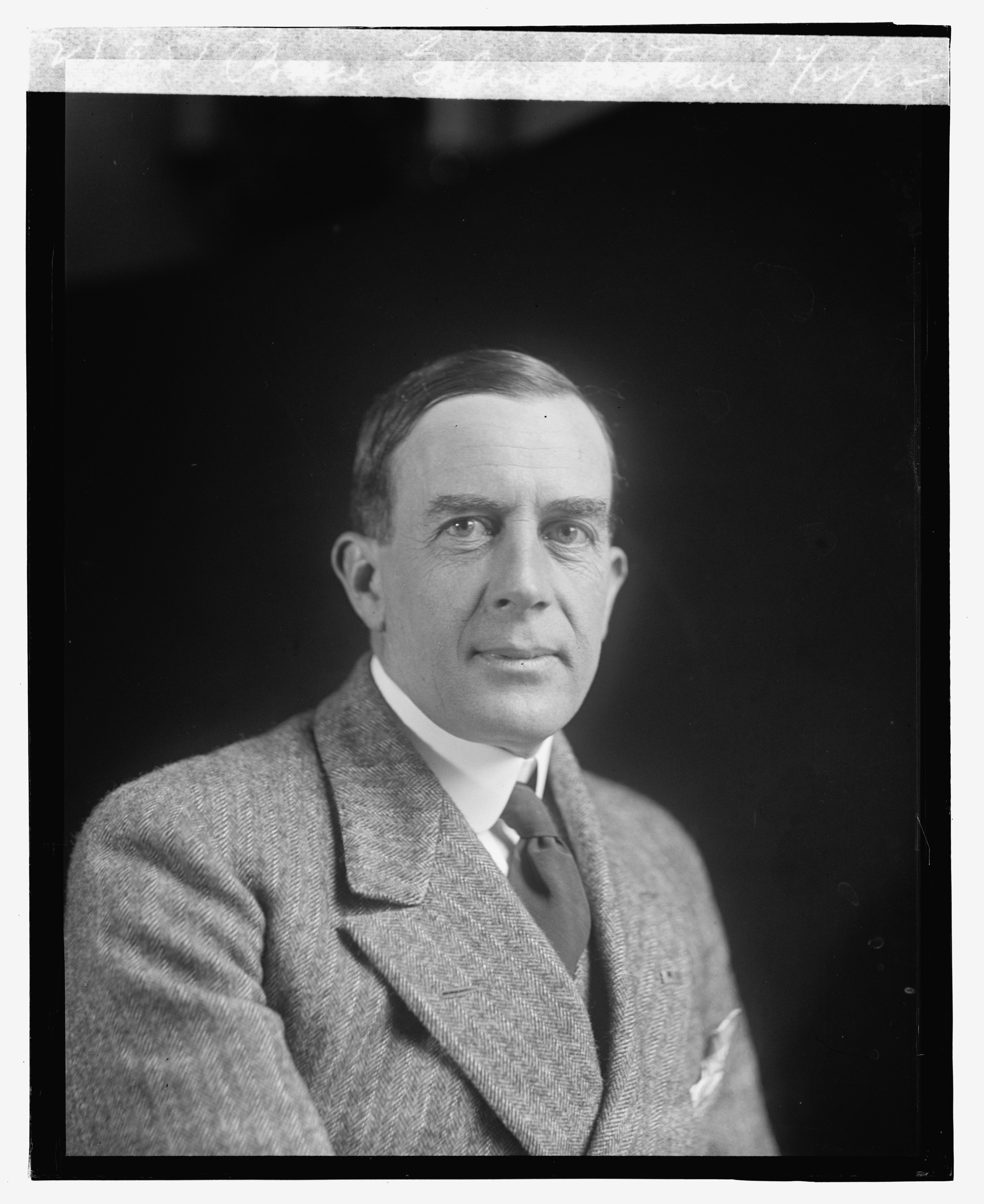

Ambassador of Italy to the United States
- In office December 22, 1922 – February 7, 1925
- Monarch: Victor Emmanuel III of Italy
- Preceded by: Vittorio Rolandi Ricci
- Succeeded by: Giacomo De Martino

Personal details
- Born: April 7, 1877 Rome
- Died: October 23, 1934 (aged 57) Minas Gerais
- Parents: Onorato Caetani (father); Ada Bootle-Wilbraham (*July 14, 1846 in London August 16, 1934 in Rome) (mother)
- Relatives: Leone Caetani (brother)
- Education: Columbia University (1903)

Gelasio Caetani (March 7, 1877 – October 23, 1934) was an Italian nobleman and diplomat from the princely Caetani family who rose to fame during the First World War as an army officer and mining engineer.

== Life and career ==
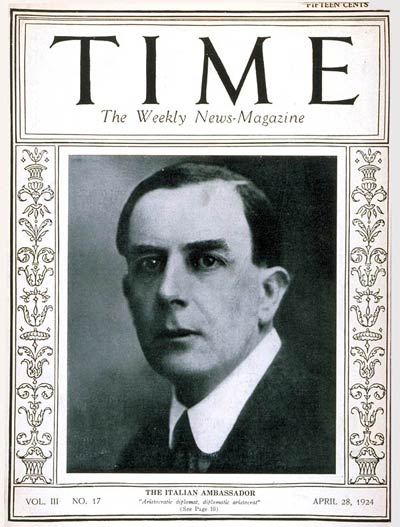
Time cover, April 28, 1924

Gelasio Caetani was the second youngest of five sons of Onorato Caetani, 14th Duke of Sermoneta, 4th Prince of Teano (1842 – 1917), who briefly occupied the office of Italian Foreign Minister. The Caetani family played an important role in the history of Pisa and of Rome, and had produced Pope Gelasius II and Pope Boniface VIII.

Born in Rome on March 7, 1877, Caetani graduated from the Columbia University School of Mines in 1903. He dug gold in Idaho and filled several other mining contracts before founding the firm of Caetani, Burch & Hershey in San Francisco.

When Italy entered the First World War, he returned home and joined the Italian army engineers. In April 1916 he led a successful tunnelling attack on an Austro-Hungarian stronghold on top of Col di Lana. Promoted to colonel by the end of the war, Gelasio Caetani won three decorations for bravery.

After the First World War, he pursued a political career and served as mayor of Rome. In 1922, as a supporter of Mussolini, he became Italian ambassador to the United States.

Beginning in 1921, Caetani created the Garden of Ninfa in the English garden style and restored some of the buildings there.

He died of natural causes in 1934.

== See also ==
- List of covers of Time magazine (1920s)
- John Norton-Griffiths, who played a similar role in the British military mining service in WW I
