= Varricchio (surname) =

Varricchio is an Italian surname. Notable people with the surname include:

- Armando Varricchio (born 1961), Italian ambassador
- Massimiliano Varricchio (born 1976), Italian former footballer
