= Confalonieri =

Confalonieri is an Italian surname. Notable people with the surname include:

- Ansperto Confalonieri (died 7 December 881), archbishop of Milan from 861 to 881
- Carlo Confalonieri (1893–1986), Italian Cardinal of the Roman Catholic Church
- Christina Confalonieri (born 1981), Italian-born South Korean broadcaster and radio host
- Corrado Confalonieri (1284–1351), Italian saint, penitent and hermit
- Diego Confalonieri (born 1979), Italian fencer
- Fedele Confalonieri (1937–), Italian manager, President of Venerable Factory of the Duomo of Milan
- Federico Confalonieri (1785–1846), Italian revolutionist
- Giulio Confalonieri (1896–1972), Italian musician, musicologist, composer and musical critic
- Luigi Girolamo Cusani-Confalonieri, Ambassador of Italy to the United States from 1910 to 1914
- Maria Giulia Confalonieri (born 1993), Italian track and road racing cyclist
- Vittorio Badini Confalonieri (1914–1993), Italian politician
