= Ansbert =

Ansbert may refer to:

- Ansbert (6th century), Frankish nobleman
- Ansbert of Rouen (died c. 695), saint and bishop
- Anspert, archbishop of Milan from 868 to 881
- Ansbert, conventional name of the author of the History of the Expedition of the Emperor Frederick (c. 1195)
