= List of ambassadors of Italy to the European Union =

Permanent Representative of Italy to the European Union
- Rappresentante Permanente d'Italia presso l'Unione europea in Bruxelles
- Emblem of Italy
- Incumbent; Vincenzo Celeste since 10 March 2023
- Inaugural holder: Attilio Cattani
- Formation: 1958

The Permanent Representative of Italy to the European Union is the head of the diplomatic mission of the Italian Republic to the European Union. The post is usually held by an Italian diplomat with the rank of ambassador, who simultaneously serves as the representative of Italy at the European Commission.

== List of representatives ==
Diplomatic accreditation	Officeholder	Administration
European Economic Community
20 February 1958	Attilio Cattani	Zoli
5 May 1961	Antonio Venturini	Fanfani III
16 April 1967	Giorgio Bombassei Frascani de Vettor	Moro III
28 April 1976	Eugenio Plaja	Moro V
16 September 1980	Renato Ruggiero	Cossiga II
13 February 1984	Pietro Calamia	Craxi I
15 January 1990	Federico Di Roberto	Andreotti VI
7 May 1993	Enzo Perlot	Ciampi
European Union
3 November 1995	Luigi Guidobono Cavalchini Garofoli	Dini
7 February 2000	Silvio Fagiolo	D'Alema II
2 March 2001	Roberto Nigido	Amato II
25 September 2001	Umberto Vattani	Berlusconi II
1 March 2004	Rocco Antonio Cangelosi	Berlusconi II
23 June 2008	Ferdinando Nelli Feroci	Berlusconi IV
2 July 2013	Stefano Sannino	Letta
21 March 2016	Carlo Calenda	Renzi
1 June 2016	Massari	Renzi
11 March 2021	Pietro Benassi	Draghi
10 March 2023	Vincenzo Celeste	Meloni
