= Luigi Vittorio Ferraris =

Italian diplomat (1928–2018)

Italian Ambassador to Germany
- In office 1980–1987
- Preceded by: Corrado Orlandi Contucci
- Succeeded by: Raniero Vanni d'Archirafi

Personal details
- Born: March 20, 1928 Roma
- Died: 13 November 2018 (aged 90) Senigallia
- Spouse: Giovanna Franzi' Carlotti (1926 - 2014) m. 1952
- Children: Chiara F. (1956); Alberto M. (1958)
- Parent(s): Luigi Angelo (1887 - 1966) & Maria Croce (1898 - 1985)
- Education: University of Rome
- Occupation: Diplomat

Luigi Vittorio Ferraris (20 March 1928 – 13 November 2018) was an Italian diplomat.

== Biography ==
He graduated in law at the University of Rome in 1949, he also studied law in Heidelberg (Germany) and obtained a Diploma in International Law in The Hague in 1951.

In 1952 he entered the diplomatic service, and served as Vice Consul in Newark, New Jersey from 1955 to 1957, as Second Secretary at the Embassy in Ankara from 1957 to 1959, as First Secretary at the Embassy in Sofia from 1959 to 1962, as Counsellor and then First Counsellor at the Italian Embassy in Caracas from 1963 to 1967 and as First Counsellor at the Italian Embassy in Warsaw from 1967 to 1969.

At the Ministry he was also in charge of the Eastern Europe Office and participated in the Helsinki negotiations within the Conference on Security and Co-operation in Europe (CSCE).

He was Ambassador of Italy in Bonn from 1980 to 1987.

After his diplomatic career, from 1987 to 2000 he was State Counsellor and from 2000 he was appointed Honorary President of the Council of State. From February to May 1996 he was Under Secretary at the Ministry of Foreign Affairs in the first Dini Government.

He is the author of books on the Ministry of Foreign Affairs, Venezuela and Germany and of about 400 essays and articles related to international relations, history of international relations and politics, and Eastern European politics.

== Works ==
- 1955, L'amministrazione centrale del Ministero degli Esteri italiano nel suo sviluppo 1848-1954, Biblioteca della “Rivista di Studi Politici Internazionali,” Firenze,.
- 1973 (Pseudonym Luigi Valsalice). Guerriglia e politica. L'esempio del Venezuela (1962-1969), Valmartina Editore in Firenze, Firenze.
- 1975 (Pseudonym Luigi Valsalice). Guerrilla y politica. Curso de Acción en Venezuela (1962-1969), Editorial Pleamar, Buenos Aires.
- 1977, (editor). Testimonianze di un negoziato: Helsinki, Ginevra, Helsinki 1972-1975, CEDAM, Padova.
- 1979, Report on a negotiation: Helsinki - Geneva - Helsinki, 1972-1975, Leiden, Geneva.
- 1988, Wenn schon, denn schon - Aber ohne Hysterie. An meine deutschen Freunde, Monaco di Baviera, Pintul.
- 1995, with Günter Trautmann and Hartmut Ullrich. Italien auf dem Weg zur “Zweiten Republik”? Die politische En twicklung Italiens seit 1992, Peter Lang, Frankfurt a. M..
- 1996, editor). Manuale della politica estera italiana 1947-1993, Laterza, Bari.
- 1998, Ferraris, Luigi Vittorio (a cura di). Annuario di politica estera italiana - luglio/dicembre 1996, Editoriale Scientifica, Napoli.

== Honours ==
- Knight Grand Cross of the Order of Merit of the Italian Republic - 2 June 1982

== See also ==
- Ministry of Foreign Affairs (Italy)
- Foreign relations of Italy

Preceded by Corrado Orlandi Contucci	Italian Ambassador to Germany; 1980-1987	Succeeded by Raniero Vanni d'Archirafi
