= List of ambassadors of Italy to the United States =

Ambassador of Italy to the United States
- Ambasciatore d'Italia negli Stati Uniti
- Emblem of Italy
- Incumbent; Marco Peronaci since September 5, 2025
- Style: His/Her Excellency
- Seat: Embassy of Italy, Washington, D.C.
- Formation: April 13, 1861
- Website: Ambasciata d'Italia, Washington

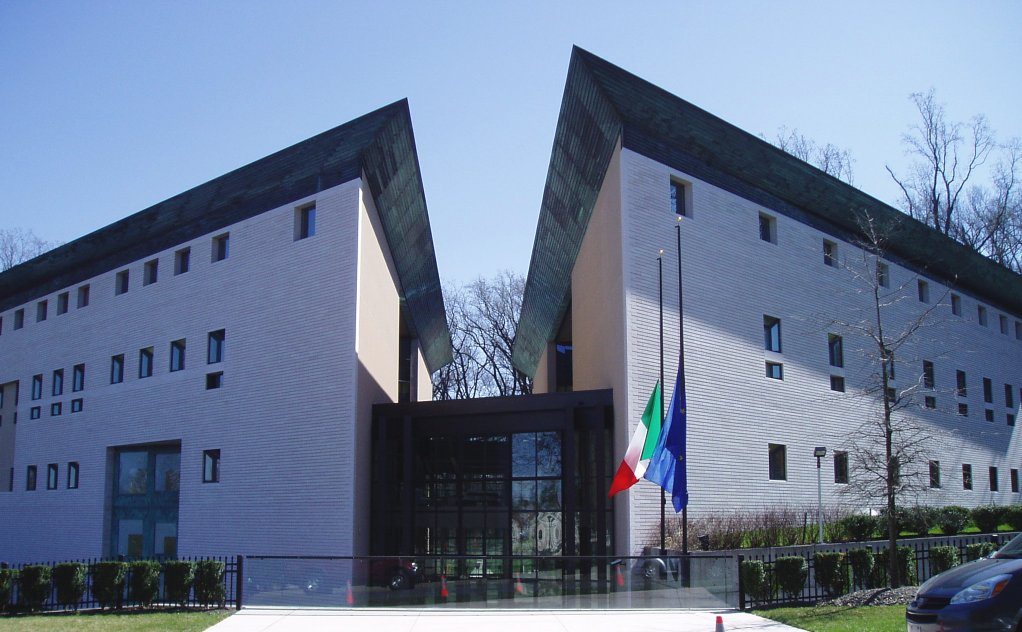
Italian Embassy, Washington, D.C.

The Ambassador of the Italian Republic to the United States of America (Italian: Ambasciatore della Repubblica Italiana negli Stati Uniti d'America) is the official representative of the government of Italy to the government of the United States. Prior to the formation of the Italian Republic in 1946, the Kingdom of Italy was represented in the United States by ambassadors or envoys extraordinary and ministers plenipotentiary.

== List of heads of mission ==
Listed are the heads of the Italian diplomatic delegation to the United States, with their titles and dates of their presentation of credentials.

=== Representatives of the Kingdom of Italy ===
Name	Title	Start date
Giuseppe Bertinatti	Minister resident	April 13, 1861
Giuseppe Bertinatti	Envoy extraordinary and minister plenipotentiary	June 26, 1864
Marcello Cerruti	Envoy extraordinary and minister plenipotentiary	May 27, 1867
Luigi Corti	Envoy extraordinary and minister plenipotentiary	February 13, 1870
Alberto Blanc	Envoy extraordinary and minister plenipotentiary	July 17, 1875
Saverio Fava	Envoy extraordinary and minister plenipotentiary	August 28, 1881
Saverio Fava	Ambassador extraordinary and minister plenipotentiary	May 21, 1893
Edmondo Mayor de Planches	Ambassador extraordinary and minister plenipotentiary	August 9, 1901
Luigi Girolamo Cusani-Confalonieri	Ambassador	January 27, 1910
Vincenzo Macchi di Cellere	Ambassador	November 20, 1913
Camillo Romano Avezzana	Ambassador	October 23, 1919
Vittorio Rolandi Ricci	Ambassador	November 24, 1920
Gelasio Caetani di Sermoneta	Ambassador	November 12, 1922
Giacomo De Martino	Ambassador	January 25, 1925
Augusto Rosso	Ambassador	August 25, 1932
Fulvio Suvich	Ambassador	June 18, 1936
Ascanio Colonna	Ambassador	October 28, 1938
Alberto Tarchiani	Ambassador	February 23, 1945

=== Ambassadors of the Italian Republic ===
Name	Start date
Alberto Tarchiani	February 23, 1945
Manlio Brosio	November 18, 1954
Sergio Fenoaltea	May 5, 1961
Egidio Ortona	June 11, 1967
Roberto Gaja	July 12, 1975
Paolo Pansa Cedronio	March 18, 1978
Rinaldo Petrignani	June 15, 1981
Boris Biancheri-Chiappori	August 31, 1991
Ferdinando Salleo	November 9, 1995
Sergio Vento	March 24, 2003
Giovanni Castellaneta	October 1, 2005
Giulio Maria Terzi di Sant'Agata	October 1, 2009
Claudio Bisogniero	February 6, 2012
Armando Varricchio	March 2, 2016
Mariangela Zappia	July 1, 2021
Marco Peronaci	September 5, 2025

== See also ==
- Italy–United States relations
- List of diplomatic missions in the United States
- Ministry of Foreign Affairs (Italy)
- List of ambassadors of the United States to Italy
- Foreign relations of Italy
