= Raniero Vanni d'Archirafi =

Italian diplomat and European bureaucrat (born 1931)

European Commissioner for Internal Market
- In office 1993–1995
- President: Jacques Delors
- Preceded by: Martin Bangemann
- Succeeded by: Mario Monti

Italian ambassador to Germany
- In office 1987–1989
- Preceded by: Luigi Vittorio Ferraris
- Succeeded by: Marcello Guidi

Personal details
- Born: 7 June 1931 (age 95) Geneva, Switzerland
- Party: Independent
- Education: University of Rome
- Occupation: Bureaucrat, diplomat

Raniero Vanni d'Archirafi (born 7 June 1931) is a former Italian diplomat and European bureaucrat. He served as ambassador of Italy to Spain and the Federal Republic of Germany. He was also one of the European Commissioners of Italy.

== Early life and education ==
Vanni d'Archirafi was born in Geneva on 7 June 1931. He has a bachelor's degree in law from the Sapienza University of Rome. In 1954, he received a PhD in law.

== Career ==
Vanni d'Archirafi began his career at the ministry of foreign affairs in 1956. In 1957, he served at the Italian Consulate in Munich. He became representative of Italy to the European Economic Community (ECC) in Brussels in 1961. From 1966 to 1969, he worked at the Italian embassy in Buenos Aires. He was Italian ambassador to Spain (1984–1987) and to the Federal Republic of Germany (1987–1989). In the latter diplomatic post he replaced Luigi Vittorio Ferraris. Vanni D'Archirafi's tenure ended in 1989 when Marcello Guidi was named as the Italian ambassador to the Federal Republic of Germany.

Then he began to serve as general director of economic affairs at the government led by Prime Minister Giulio Andreotti in 1989. Next he became general director of political affairs at the ministry of foreign affairs.

In 1993 Vanni d'Archirafi was nominated as a member of the European Commission. He served in the post until 1995. During this period, he was the European commissioner for internal market and services together with Martin Bangemann. Vanni d'Archirafi was responsible for enterprise policy as commissioner.

He left politics after completing his tenure at the commission in January 1995. He is one of the EuropEFE Board of Directors.

== Honors and awards ==
Order of Merit of the Italian Republic 1st Class / Knight Grand Cross – 18 April 1990

In 1994, Vanni D'Archirafi was awarded the Robert Schuman medal.

== See also ==
- Foreign relations of Italy

Preceded by Luigi Vittorio Ferraris	Italian Ambassador to Germany; 1987-1989	Succeeded by Marcello Guidi
