= Umberto Vattani =

Italian diplomat (born 1938)

Secretary General of the Ministry of Foreign Affairs
- In office 1 September 1997 – 24 September 2001
- Preceded by: Boris Biancheri
- Succeeded by: Giuseppe Baldocci
- In office 1 March 2004 – 16 July 2005
- Preceded by: Giuseppe Baldocci
- Succeeded by: Paolo Pucci di Benisichi

Permanent Representative of Italy to the European Union
- In office 2001–2004
- Prime Minister: Silvio Berlusconi
- Preceded by: Roberto Nigido
- Succeeded by: Rocco Cangelosi

Italian Ambassador to Germany
- In office 2005–2010
- Preceded by: Marcello Guidi
- Succeeded by: Enzo Perlot

Personal details
- Born: 5 December 1938 (age 87) Skopje, Kingdom of Yugoslavia
- Education: University of Copenhagen

Umberto Vattani (born 5 December 1938) is an Italian diplomat. The only official in the history of Italy to have twice held the position of Secretary General of the Ministry of Foreign Affairs. He was also the last president of the National Institute for Foreign Trade until his suppression in 2011.

== Education ==
Born in Skopje (then Kingdom of Yugoslavia), to a family of officials from the Ministry of Foreign Affairs, he studied in France, England and Connecticut, at Wesleyan University, on a Fulbright Program. In 1960 he obtained a degree in Law at Sapienza University of Rome and in 1962 a degree in political science.

In 1961, following a public competition, he was hired by the Bank of Italy and assigned to the Research Office. The following year, for subsequent competition, Vattani was hired at the Ministry of Foreign Affairs and entered the diplomatic career.

== Diplomatic career ==
His first experiences brought him to New York City to the Italian representation at the United Nations (1963 - 1965) and to Paris, to the Italian representation at the OECD (1966 - 1969). After a short period at the Italian Embassy in London, he returned to Italy as deputy head of cabinet of Foreign Ministers Mariano Rumor and Arnaldo Forlani (1975 - 1978). Later, as head of the Cabinet Minister with responsibility for scientific and technological research (1978- 1980), he promoted the entry of Italy into the European Southern Observatory (ESO).

Between 1980 and 1981, Vattani was head secretary of the Prime Minister Arnaldo Forlani, and later plenipotentiary minister at the Italian Embassy in London (1982 - 1986). [1] In 1986 he returned to Rome to take on the role of diplomatic adviser to the presidents of the Council of Ministers Ciriaco De Mita, Giulio Andreotti and Giuliano Amato (1988 - 1992) and was appointed Sherpa for the G7 summits.

Appointed later ambassador in Bonn, Germany remained for five years (1992- 1996). Back in Rome, he served as head of cabinet of the Minister of Foreign Affairs Lamberto Dini in the Prodi I Cabinet.

In September 1997, Vattani was appointed first secretary general, replacing Boris Biancheri, the most important assignment for a diplomat at the Foreign Ministry (1997- 2001).

With the start of Berlusconi II Cabinet (2001), Vattani was initially indicated as a possible foreign minister. When Berlusconi finally chose Renato Ruggiero, they replaced it with the General Secretariat colleague Giuseppe Baldocci, and sent Vattani to Brussels (2001- 2003) as the Permanent Representative of Italy to the European Union, in the period of Romano Prodi as President of the European Commission.

In 2004, following the retirement of Ambassador Baldocci, Vattani was appointed Secretary General of the Ministry of Foreign Affairs for the second time, until June 2005.

In 2005 Vattani was nominated president of the National Institute for Foreign Trade by the Council of Ministers and in 2009 he was reconfirmed for a second term until the institution was suppressed in 2011.

He is president of the Japan-Italy Foundation and general manager of the Italy–USA Foundation. He is president of Venice International University, formed on the Italian side by the University of Padua, the Ca' Foscari University of Venice and the Università Iuav di Venezia in Venice . He was president of Sviluppo Italia Sicilia until 2012.

== Honours ==
=== National honours ===
- Knight Grand Cross of the Order of Merit of the Italian Republic - 27 December 1997
- Grand Officer of the Order of Merit of the Italian Republic - 27 December 1986
- Commander of the Order of Merit of the Italian Republic - 27 December 1983

=== Foreign honours ===
- Brazil: Grand Cross of the Order of the Southern Cross
- France: Commander of the Legion of Honour
- Germany: Grand Cross of the Order of Merit of the Federal Republic of Germany
- Portugal: Knight Grand Cross of the Order of Prince Henry
- United Kingdom: Honorary Knight Grand Cross of Order of St Michael and St George
- Vatican City: Knight Grand Cross of the Order of St. Gregory the Great
- Vatican City: Knight Grand Cross of the Order of Pope Pius IX

== See also ==
- Ministry of Foreign Affairs (Italy)
- Foreign relations of Italy

Preceded by Boris Biancheri	Secretary General of the Ministry of Foreign Affairs; 1997–2001	Succeeded by Giuseppe Baldocci
Preceded by Giuseppe Baldocci	Secretary General of the Ministry of Foreign Affairs; 2004–2005	Succeeded by Paolo Pucci di Benisichi
Preceded by Marcello Guidi	Italian Ambassador to Germany; 2005-2010	Succeeded by Enzo Perlot
