= Ferdinando Nelli Feroci =

Italian diplomat

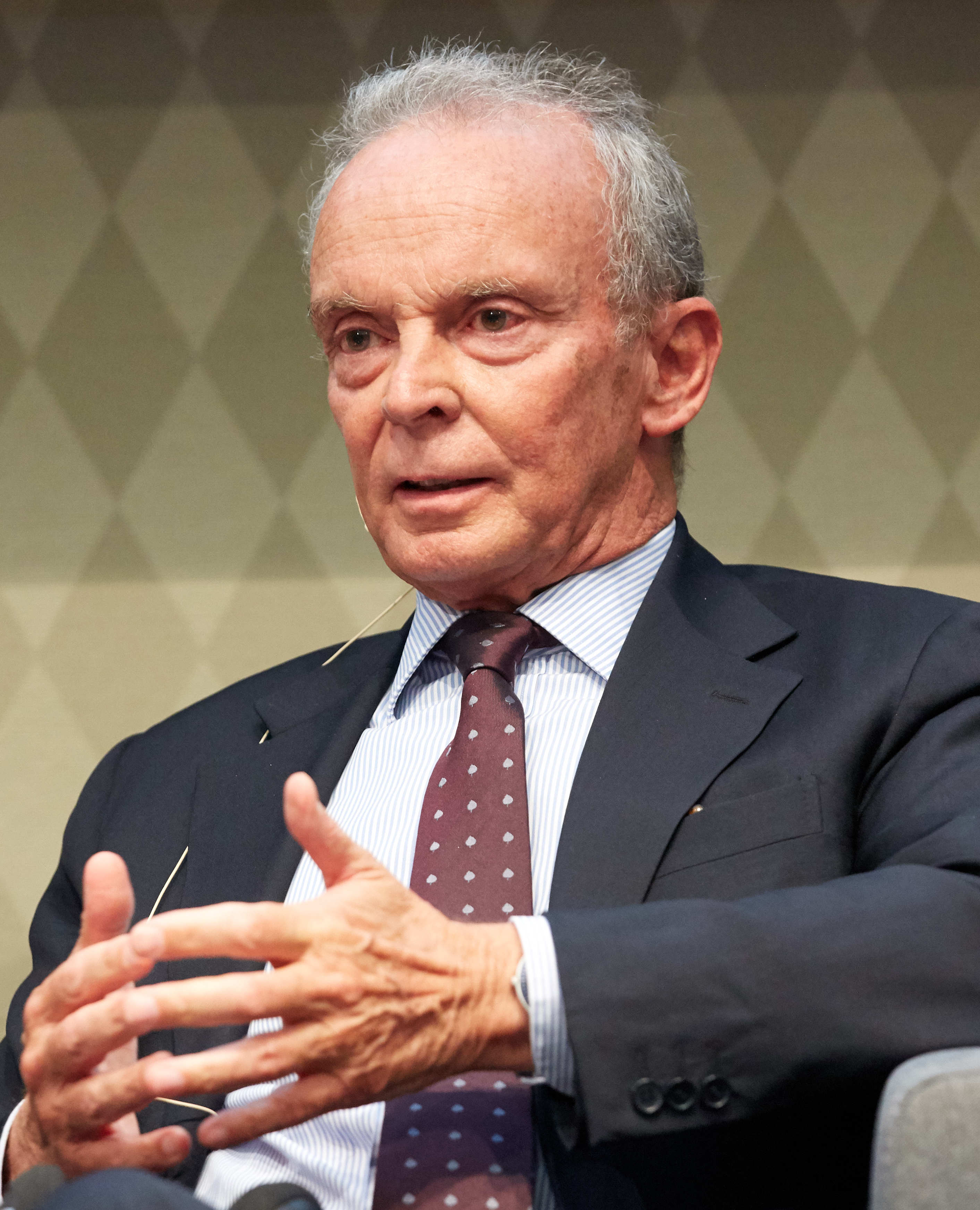
- Nelli Feroci in 2018

European Commissioner for Industry and Entrepreneurship
- In office 17 July 2014 – 31 October 2014
- President: José Manuel Barroso
- Preceded by: Antonio Tajani
- Succeeded by: Elżbieta Bieńkowska

Permanent Representative of Italy to the European Union
- In office 28 June 2008 – 2 July 2013
- Preceded by: Rocco Cangelosi
- Succeeded by: Stefano Sannino

Personal details
- Born: 18 December 1946 (age 79) Pisa, Italy
- Party: Independent
- Education: University of Pisa
- Profession: Diplomat, academic

Ferdinando Nelli Feroci (born 18 December 1946) is an Italian diplomat who served briefly as a European Commissioner in 2014.

== Biography ==
Nelli Feroci was born in Pisa. He graduated from the University of Pisa with a degree in law in 1970, and in 1972 entered the Italian diplomatic service.

He served with Italy's delegation to the United Nations in New York, and with its embassies in Algeria, the United States, France and China.

From 2004 to 2006, he was Director-general for European integration at the Ministry of Foreign Affairs, and from 2006 to 2008 he was chief of staff to Foreign Minister Massimo D'Alema. Then from 2008 to 2013, he was the Permanent Representative of Italy to the European Union.

In June 2014 Nelli Feroci was appointed as Italy's European Commissioner, replacing Antonio Tajani as Commissioner for Industry and Entrepreneurship in the second Barroso Commission. He took office in July, and held the post position he held until Commission's mandate expired on 1 November 2014.

He later became a professor at the School of Government of the Free International University of Social Studies "Guido Carli" (LUISS) in Rome, and President of the Istituto Affari Internazionali.

== Honors ==
Order of Merit of the Italian Republic 1st Class / Knight Grand Cross – December 23, 2008

== See also ==
- Ministry of Foreign Affairs (Italy)
- Foreign relations of Italy
