= List of ambassadors of Italy to Tunisia =

Coordinates: 36.835328°N 10.166788°E

Ambassador of Italy to Tunisia
- Emblem of Italy
- Incumbent; Lorenzo Fanara since March 27, 2018
- Inaugural holder: Raffaele Ferretti
- Formation: October 1, 1956

The Italian ambassador in Tunis is the official representative of the Government in Rome to the Government of Tunisia.

== List of representatives ==
Diplomatic accreditation	Ambassador	Observations	List of prime ministers of Italy	President of Tunisia	Term end
October 1, 1956	Raffaele Ferretti		Antonio Segni	Habib Bourguiba	
October 8, 1958	Aldo Maria Mazio		Amintore Fanfani	Habib Bourguiba	
September 27, 1962	Alessandro Tassoni Estense		Fernando Tambroni	Habib Bourguiba	
November 25, 1964	Manlio Castronuovo		Giovanni Leone	Habib Bourguiba	
April 11, 1968	Luciano Favretti		Giovanni Leone	Habib Bourguiba	
August 23, 1972	Salvatore Saraceno		Giulio Andreotti	Hédi Nouira	
January 12, 1977	Elio Giuffrida		Giulio Andreotti	Hédi Nouira	
February 7, 1980	Gianfranco Farinelli		Francesco Cossiga	Mohamed Mzali	
May 2, 1987	Claudio Moreno		Amintore Fanfani	Zine el-Abidine Ben Ali	
March 23, 1992	Francesco Caruso (1940)	(* September 19, 1940 in Naples.: 1962: Degree in Political Sciences from the University of Naples.; 1962-1963: Postgraduate specialization course, College ofEurope, Bruges (Belgium); 1963-1968: International Officer, at the European Commission, Brussels; 1968: he started his diplomatic career.; 1969-1972: At the Ministry of Foreign Affairs; 1972-1975: Italian Embassy in Paris; 1975-1977: Consul in South Africa; 1977: At the Ministry of Foreign Affairs: Head of the Secretary's Secretariat; General; 1980-1984: Counselor for the press and information at the Permanent Representation; of Italy at the EEC in Brussels and at the European Parliament in Strasbourg.: 1984-1986: Chargé d'Affaires Italian ambassador to Chile.; 1986-1987: At the Ministry of Foreign Affairs: Head of the Office of the Secretary General; 1987-1988: Diplomatic Counselor of the Minister of Foreign Trade.; 1988: Minister Plenipotentiary.; 1989-1992: Diplomatic Counselor of the Vice President of the Council.; 1992-1996: Ambassador of Italy in Tunis.; 1996-2000: Consul General in Paris.; 2000: Diplomatic Counselor of the Minister for Foreign Trade.; 2000-2001: Ciplomatic Counselor of the Minister of Justice.; 2001-2002: Head of Cabinet of the Minister of External Affairs; 2002-2005: Ambassador, Head of the Permanent Representation of Italy to UNESCO, Paris.; From September 2005 to October 2007 he was Italian ambassador to Sweden.	Giuliano Amato	Hamed Karoui	
October 2, 1996	Rocco Angelo Cangelosi		Romano Prodi	Hamed Karoui	
October 20, 1998	Armando Sanguini		Massimo D'Alema	Hamed Karoui	
June 16, 2003	Arturo Olivieri		Silvio Berlusconi	Mohamed Ghannouchi	
November 11, 2007	Antonio d'Andria		Romano Prodi	Mohamed Ghannouchi	
December 1, 2009	Pietro Benassi		Silvio Berlusconi	Mohamed Ghannouchi	
March 27, 2018	Lorenzo Fanara	(*June 1, 1970 in Agrigento).: In 1993 he graduated with honors in law at the University of Palermo.; From 1994 to 1997 he practices the profession of lawyer.; In 1998 He entered the diplomatic career and held the first positions in Rome, at the Ministry of Foreign Affairs, at the Directorate General for Personnel.; From 2002 to 2006 he worked for the Permanent Representation at the European Union in Brussels.; From 2007 to 2009 he was sent to the Embassy in Moscow.; From 2010 to 2013 he worked as a "speechwriter" at the Cabinet of Foreign Ministers Franco Frattini, Giulio Terzi di Sant'Agata and Emma Bonino.; From 2013 to the end of 2016 he was political adviser at the Embassy in London.; From January 2017 to March 2018 he is Deputy Chief of Cabinet of Minister Angelino Alfano.; Decorations: Knight of the Order of Merit of the Republic, Lorenzo Fanara.; He is married to Sophie and has two sons, Igea and Tancredi.	Paolo Gentiloni	Beji Caid Essebsi	
