= Pietro Benassi =

Italian ambassador (born 1958)

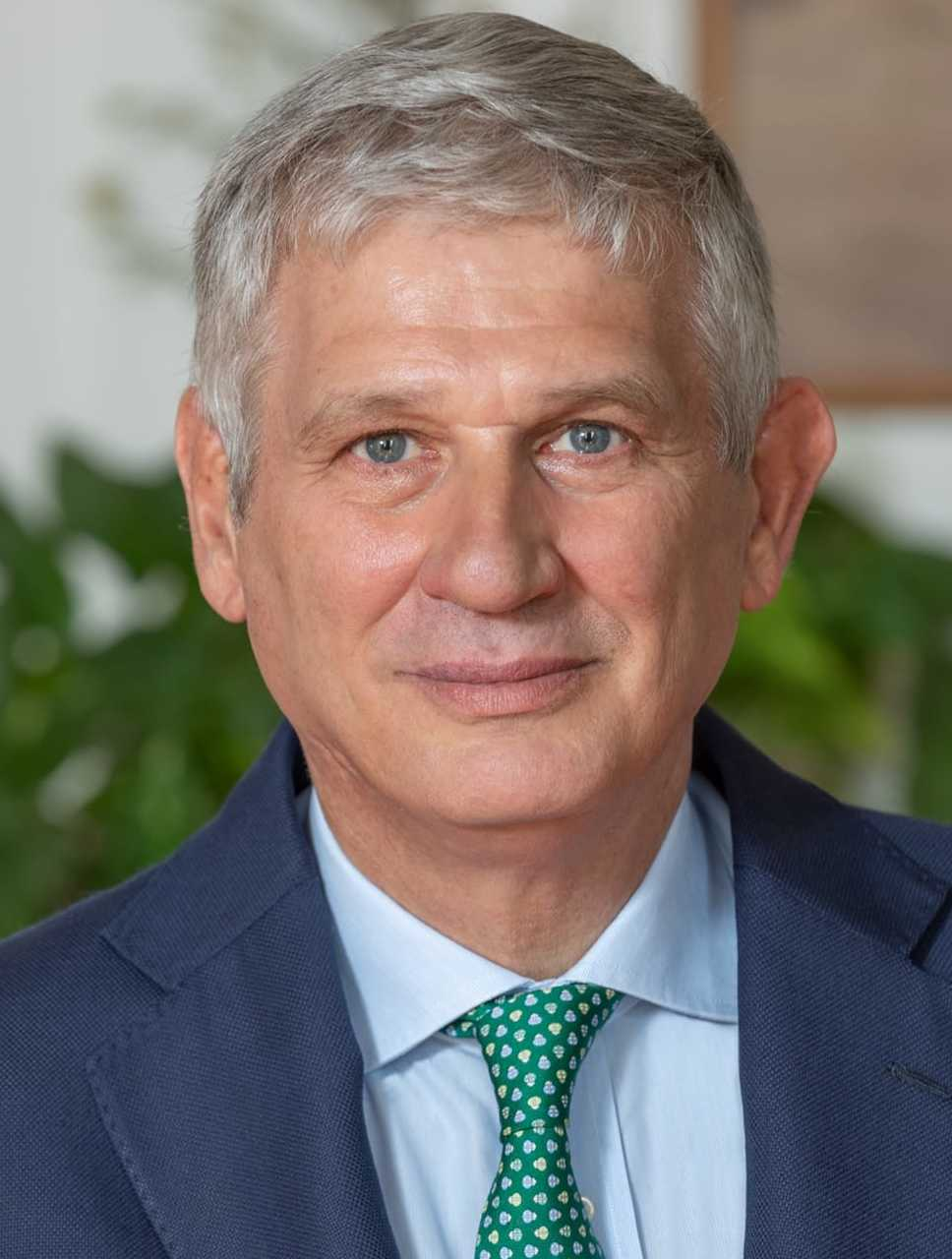

Permanent Representative of Italy to the European Union
- In office 11 March 2021 – 10 March 2023
- Prime Minister: Mario Draghi; Giorgia Meloni
- Preceded by: Maurizio Massari
- Succeeded by: Vincenzo Celeste

Undersecretary of state for the Delegated Authority for the Security of the Republic
- In office 22 January 2021 – 13 February 2021
- Prime Minister: Giuseppe Conte
- Preceded by: Luciano Pizzetti
- Succeeded by: Franco Gabrielli

Italian Ambassador to Germany
- In office 23 September 2014 – 31 August 2018
- Prime Minister: Matteo Renzi; Paolo Gentiloni; Giuseppe Conte
- Preceded by: Elio Menzione
- Succeeded by: Luigi Mattiolo

Italian Ambassador to Tunisia
- In office 1 December 2009 – 16 May 2013
- Prime Minister: Silvio Berlusconi; Mario Monti; Enrico Letta
- Preceded by: Antonio d'Andria
- Succeeded by: Fanara Lorenzo

Personal details
- Born: 7 June 1958 (age 68) Rome, Italy
- Education: University of Padua

Pietro Benassi (born 7 June 1958) is an Italian diplomat who served as permanent representative to the European Union from 2021 to 2023. He also served as undersecretary of state for the Delegated Authority for the Security of the Republic in 2021, as ambassador to Germany from 2014 to 2018, and as ambassador to Tunisia from 2009 to 2013.

== Early life ==
Benassi was born in Rome on 7 June 1958. He graduated from the University of Padua with a laurea magistrale in political science in 1980, and joined the diplomatic service in 1984.

== Career ==
On 31 July 2009 he was appointed ambassador to Tunisia. He served during the Tunisian revolution, which he affirmed Italy's support for.

He was appointed ambassador to Germany on 23 September 2014. He served until 2018, when he was appointed diplomatic advisor and sherpa for the G7 and G20 summits.

In 2021, Prime Minister Giuseppe Conte named him undersecretary of state for the Delegated Authority for the Security of the Republic.

On 11 March 2021 he was appointed permanent representative to the European Union.

== Personal life ==
Benassi speaks English, German, French and Spanish.

== Honours ==
=== National honours ===

2nd Class / Grand Officer: Grande Ufficiale Ordine al Merito della Repubblica Italiana: 2019

3rd Class / Commander: Commendatore Ordine al Merito della Repubblica Italiana: 2009

4th Class / Officer: Ufficiale Ordine al Merito della Repubblica Italiana: 2002

5th Class / Knight: Cavaliere Ordine al Merito della Repubblica Italiana: 1995

=== Foreign honours ===
- Germany: Grand Cross of the Order of Merit of the Federal Republic of Germany
- Romania: Grand Cross of the National Order of Faithful Service

Diplomatic posts
Preceded by Antonio d'Andria	Italian Ambassador to Tunisia; 2009–2013	Succeeded by Fanara Lorenzo
Preceded by Elio Menzione	Italian Ambassador to Germany; 2014–2018	Succeeded by Luigi Mattiolo
Political offices
Preceded by Luciano Pizzetti	Undersecretary of state for the Delegated Authority for the Security of the Republic; 2021–2021	Succeeded by Franco Gabrielli
Diplomatic posts
Preceded by Maurizio Massari	Permanent Representative of Italy to the European Union; 2021–2023	Succeeded by Vincenzo Celeste
