= Anspert =

Archbishop of Milan from 868 to 881

Anspert (died 7 December 881) was archbishop of Milan from 868 to 881.

== Biography ==
Despite the tradition that he was a member of the Confalonieri family, this is not confirmed. When he was not yet a bishop, Anspert received by emperor Louis II the asset of Ansprand, who had killed the monarch's brother.

He was appointed archbishop of Milan on 26 June 868 and under Louis II he was missus dominicus. An educated man, he asked Irish monks to found the archbishop's scriptorium in Milan, a centre for the production of illuminated manuscripts. On 12 August 875, he moved to Brescia, where the emperor had just died, and organized his sepulture in the basilica of Sant'Ambrogio in Milan. In January of the following year, he participated in the coronation of Charles the Bald in Pavia, and received from the new king further territories at Cavenago, Vimercate and Ornago. In July 877 he took part in a council at Ravenna in which he obtained several privileges for the Milanese archbishopric.

After Charles the Bald's death (877), Anspert entered into conflict with Pope John VIII, who favoured Boso of Vienne as King of Italy, while the Milanese proposed Carloman of Bavaria. On 1 June 879 he was excommunicated and, in the following October, deposed; however, Anspert remained in charge as the Milanese clergymen supported him. Anspert and John reconciled when they met at the coronation of Charles the Fat as King of Italy (6 January 880) at Ravenna.

During his tenure as archbishop the church of Milan was named as Ambrosian

Anspert died in Milan in December 881 and was buried in the church of Sant'Ambrogio.

== Sources ==
- Pavan, Massimiliano (1960). Alberto Maria Ghisalberti (ed.). Dizionario Biografico degli Italiani. Milan: Istituto della Enciclopedia italiana.
