= Franco Nobili =

Italian business executive

- Born: 2 December 1925; Rome, Kingdom of Italy
- Died: 26 November 2008 (aged 82); Rome, Italy
- Occupation: Business executive
- Children: Susanna Nobili

Franco Nobili (2 December 1925 – 26 November 2008) was an Italian business executive and industrial manager who served as chairman of the Istituto per la Ricostruzione Industriale (IRI) from 1989 to 1993. During his tenure, he oversaw one of the final phases of the group's history before its transformation and eventual dissolution in the 1990s. He also served as president of Italstat and held senior positions within the Italian state-owned industrial sector.
