= Embassy of Italy, Berlin =

Coordinates: 52.5094°N 13.3594°E

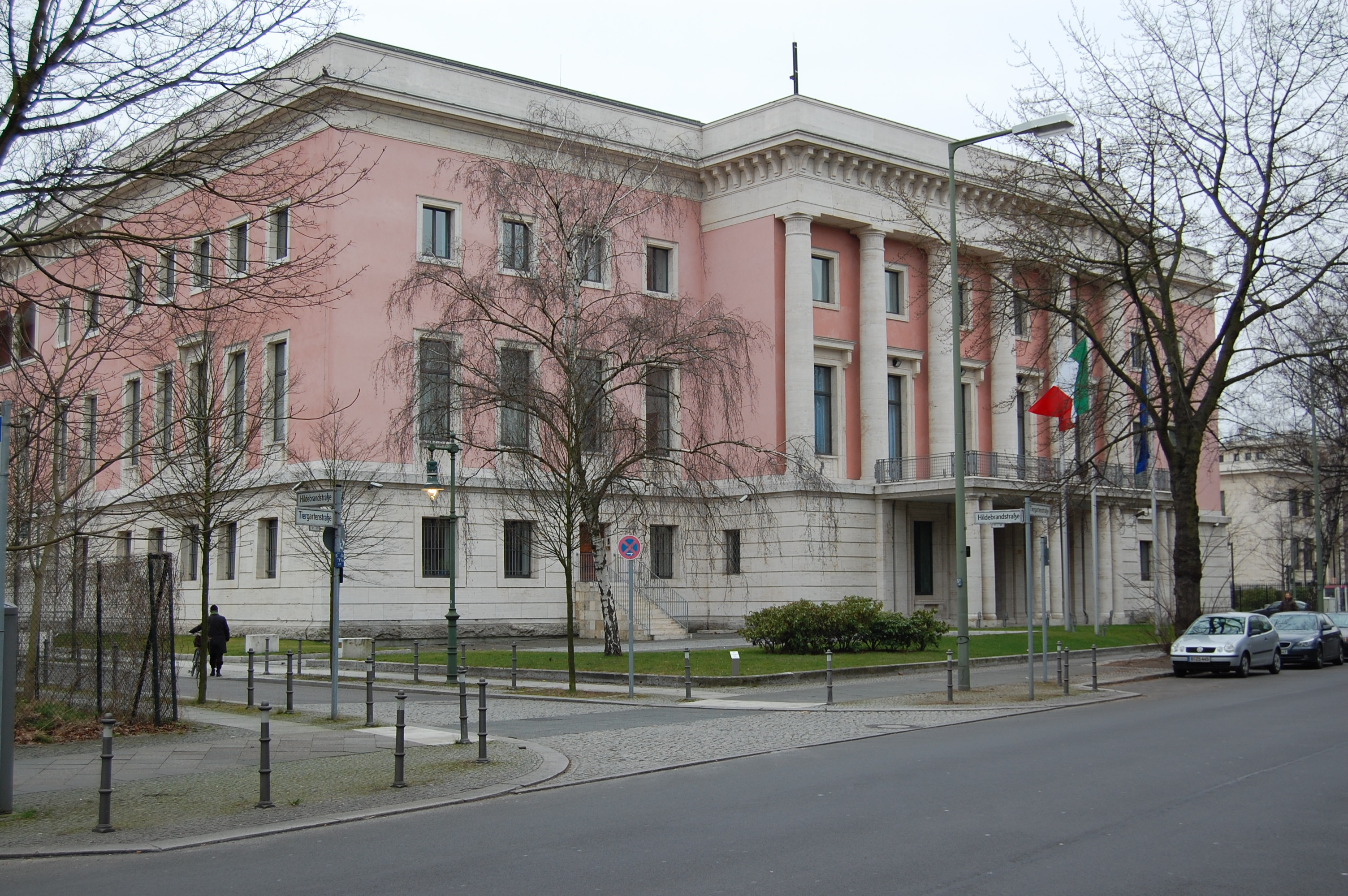
The Italian embassy at Hiroshimastreet 1 in Berlin-Tiergarten.

The Italian Embassy in Berlin is the diplomatic mission of the Italian Republic to Germany, and the seat of the Ambassador of Italy to Germany. Germany has an embassy in Rome and consulates in Milan and Naples.

== Bibliography ==
- Gaetano Cortese (2017). Il Palazzo sul Tiergarten - L' Ambasciata d'Italia a Berlino (PDF) (in Italian). Roma: Stabilimenti Tipografici Carlo Colombo. As described in Stefano Baldi. "Libri fotografici sulle Rappresentanze diplomatiche italiane all'estero".
