= Luigi Girolamo Cusani-Confalonieri =

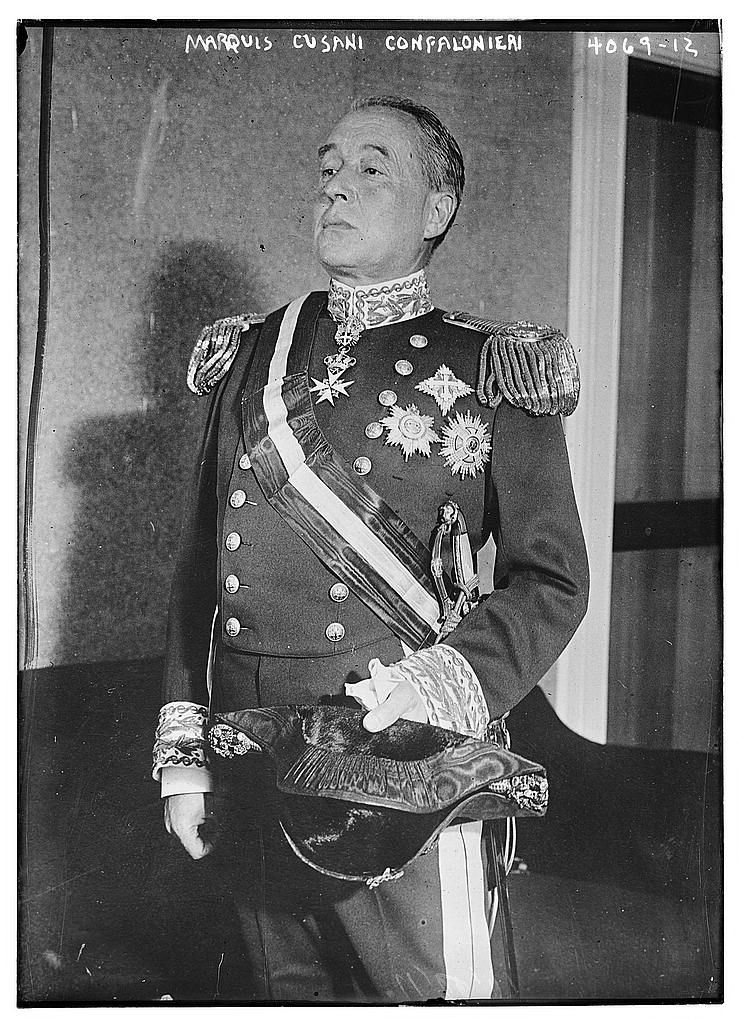
Cusani Confalonieri in 1915

Luigi Girolamo Cusani-Confalonieri (April 15, 1861 – March 10, 1934), was the Ambassador of Italy to the United States from November 1, 1910 to May 29, 1914 when he was replaced by Vincenzo Macchi Di Cellere. He was the Ambassador of Italy to Japan from April 9, 1917 to February 17, 1920.
