= Armando Varricchio =

Italian ambassador (born 1961)

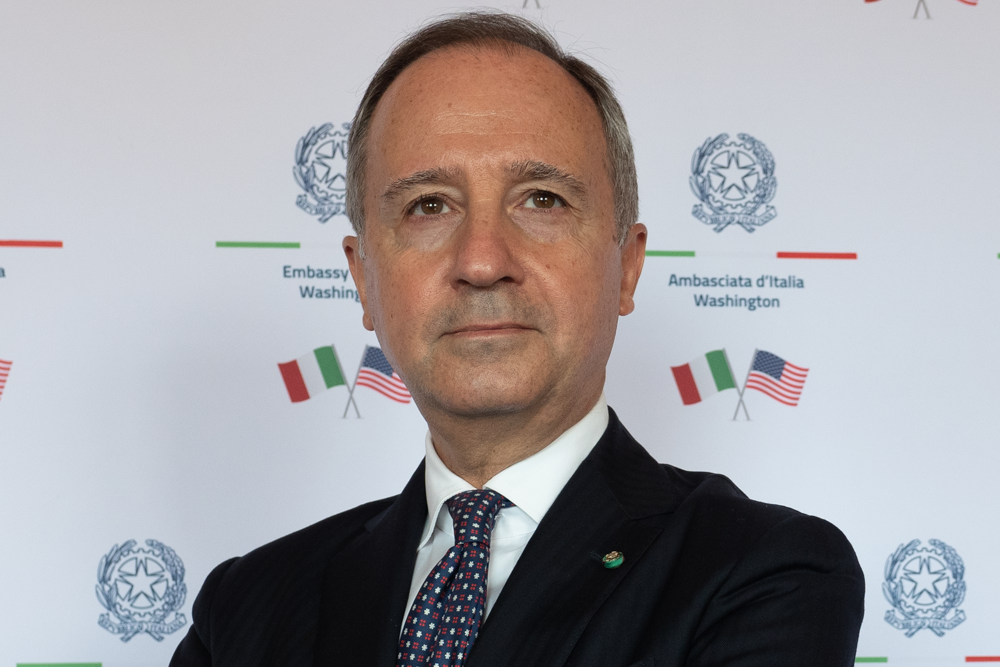
- Ambassador Armando Varricchio

Italian Ambassador to Germany
- In office 2021–2024

Italian Ambassador to the United States
- In office 2 March 2016 – 2021

Italian Ambassador to Serbia
- In office 2009–2012

Personal details
- Born: 13 June 1961 (age 65) Venice
- Education: University of Padua

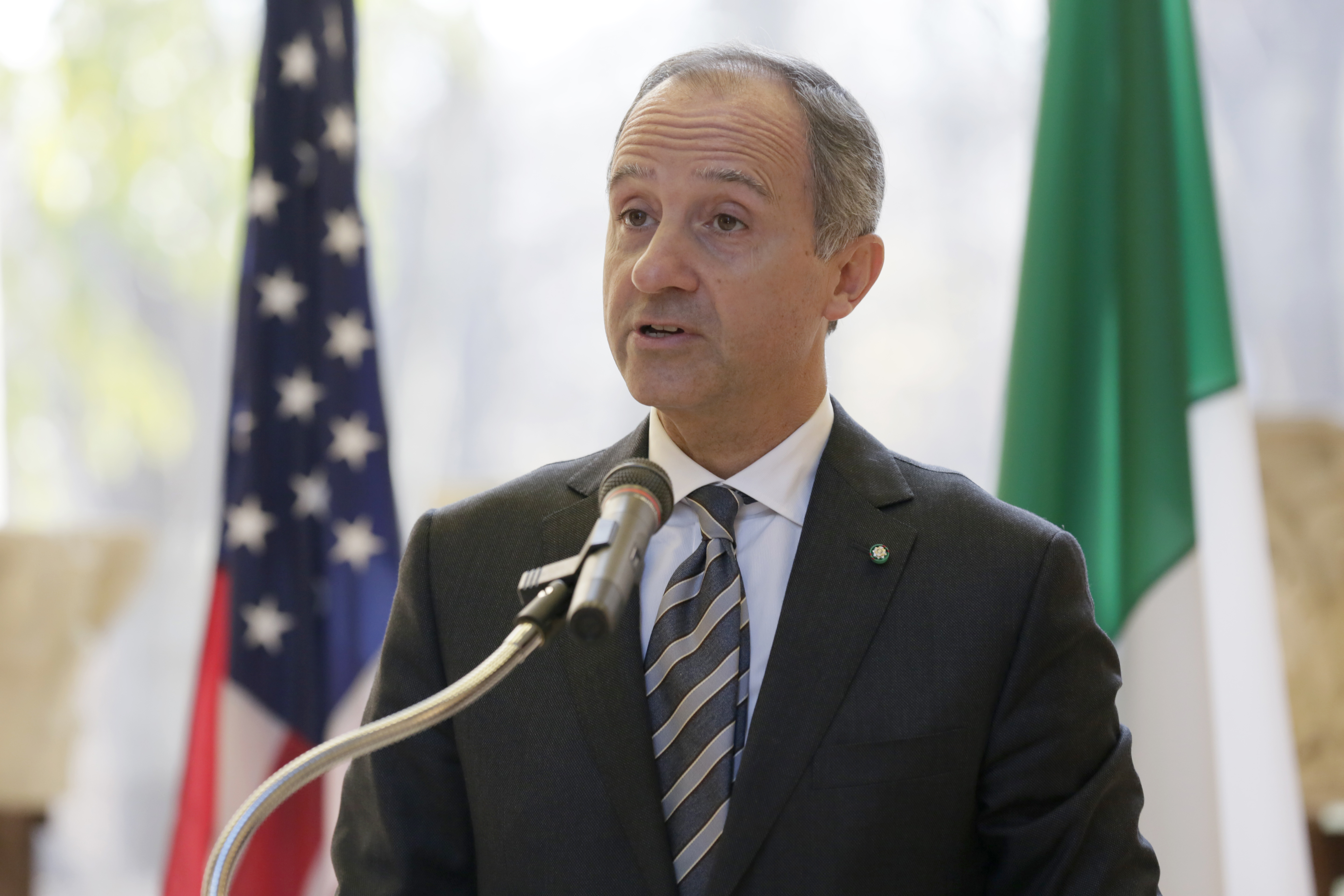
Italian Ambassador to the United States Armando Varricchio

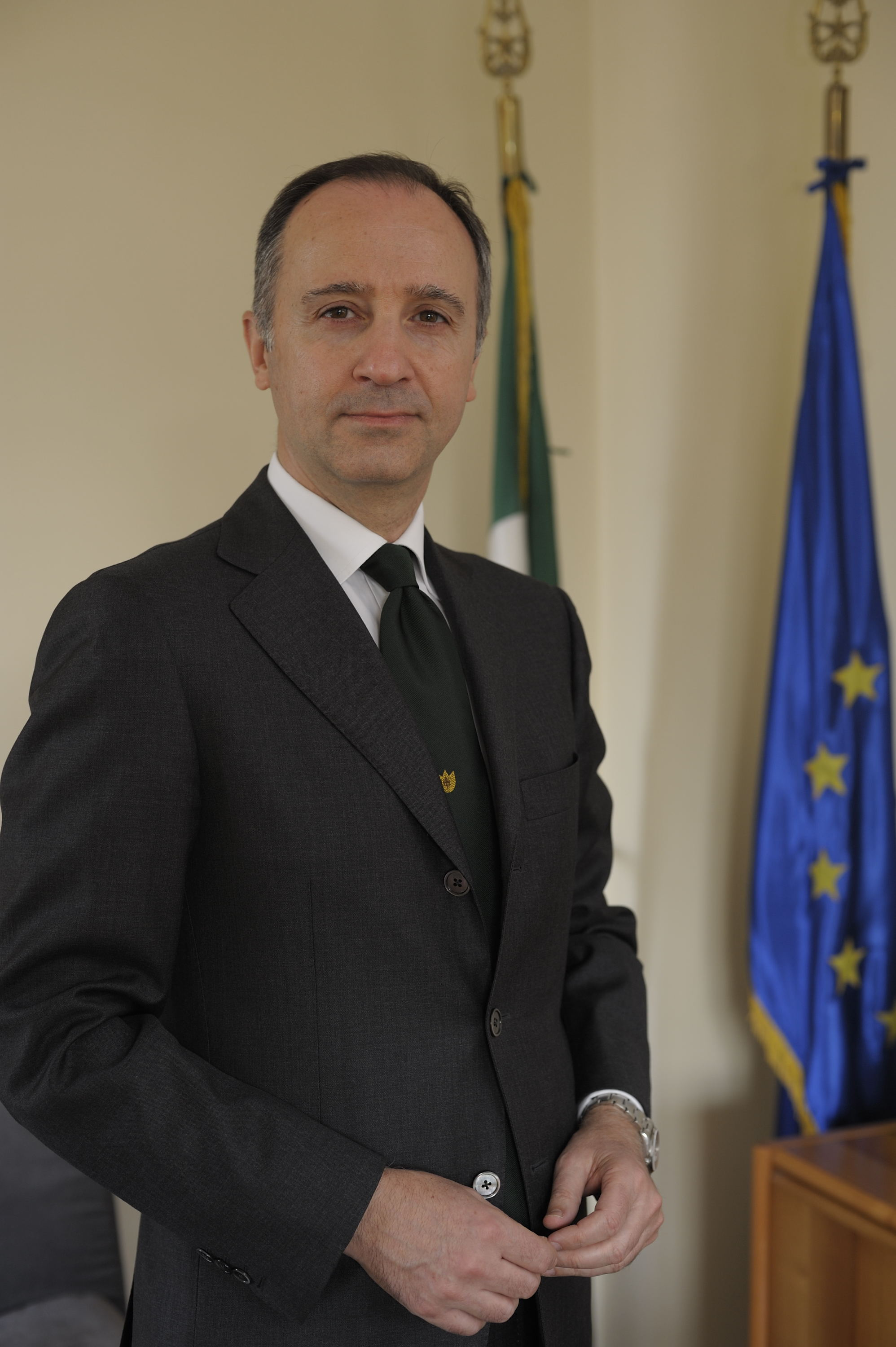
Ambassador Armando Varricchio

Armando Varricchio (born 13 June 1961, Venice, Italy) was the Italian ambassador to Germany from 2021-2024. He previously served as Ambassador to Serbia (2009–2012) and Ambassador to the United States of America (2 March 2016 – 2021).

After returning to Italy in 2012 after serving in Serbia, Varricchio was deputy secretary general of the Ministry of Foreign Affairs.

He served as Chief Diplomatic Advisor to the Presidents of the Council of Ministers Enrico Letta and Matteo Renzi, and Deputy Diplomatic Advisor to the President of the Republic, Giorgio Napolitano.

He was awarded the Knight Grand Cross of the Order of Merit of the Italian Republic, Italy's highest award.

After graduating from the University of Padua in 1985 with a degree in International Relations, he entered the Foreign Service in 1986.

Since 2015 he is a member of the Italy-USA Foundation.

== Honors ==
Order of Merit of the Italian Republic 1st Class / Knight Grand Cross – November 21, 2016

== See also ==
- Ministry of Foreign Affairs (Italy)
- Foreign relations of Italy
