= Ciampi =

Ciampi is a surname of Italian origin. Notable people with the surname include:

- Alimondo Ciampi (1876–1939), Italian sculptor
- Annalisa Ciampi, United Nations Special Rapporteur on the Rights to Freedom of Peaceful Assembly
- Anthony F. Ciampi (1816–1893), Italian-American priest
- Carlo Azeglio Ciampi (1920–2016), President of the Italian Republic
- Joe Ciampi (born 1946), retired American basketball coach
- Lucia Ciampi (born 1950), Italian politician
- Marcel Ciampi (1891–1980), French pianist and teacher
- Mario J. Ciampi (1907–2006), American architect
- Matteo Ciampi (1996), Italian swimmer
- Piero Ciampi (1934–1980), Italian singer-songwriter
- Silvano Ciampi (1932–2022), Italian racing cyclist
- Vincenzo Ciampi (1967), Italian politician
- Vincenzo Legrenzo Ciampi, Italian opera composer
- Yves Ciampi (1921–1982), French director
