= Massimiliano Pavan =

Italian historian (1920–1991)

Massimiliano Pavan (30 August 1920, in Venice – 17 January 1991, in Padua) was an Italian historian, who served as director of the Dizionario Biografico degli Italiani for the Treccani Institute. A graduate of the University of Padua alongside Aldo Ferrabino, he was taught by Concetto Marchesi and Manara Valgimigli, and was a professor of Greek and Roman history at the University of Perugia. His library and archives are at the Museo Canova.
