= Saverio Fava =

Italian diplomat

Francesco Saverio Fava
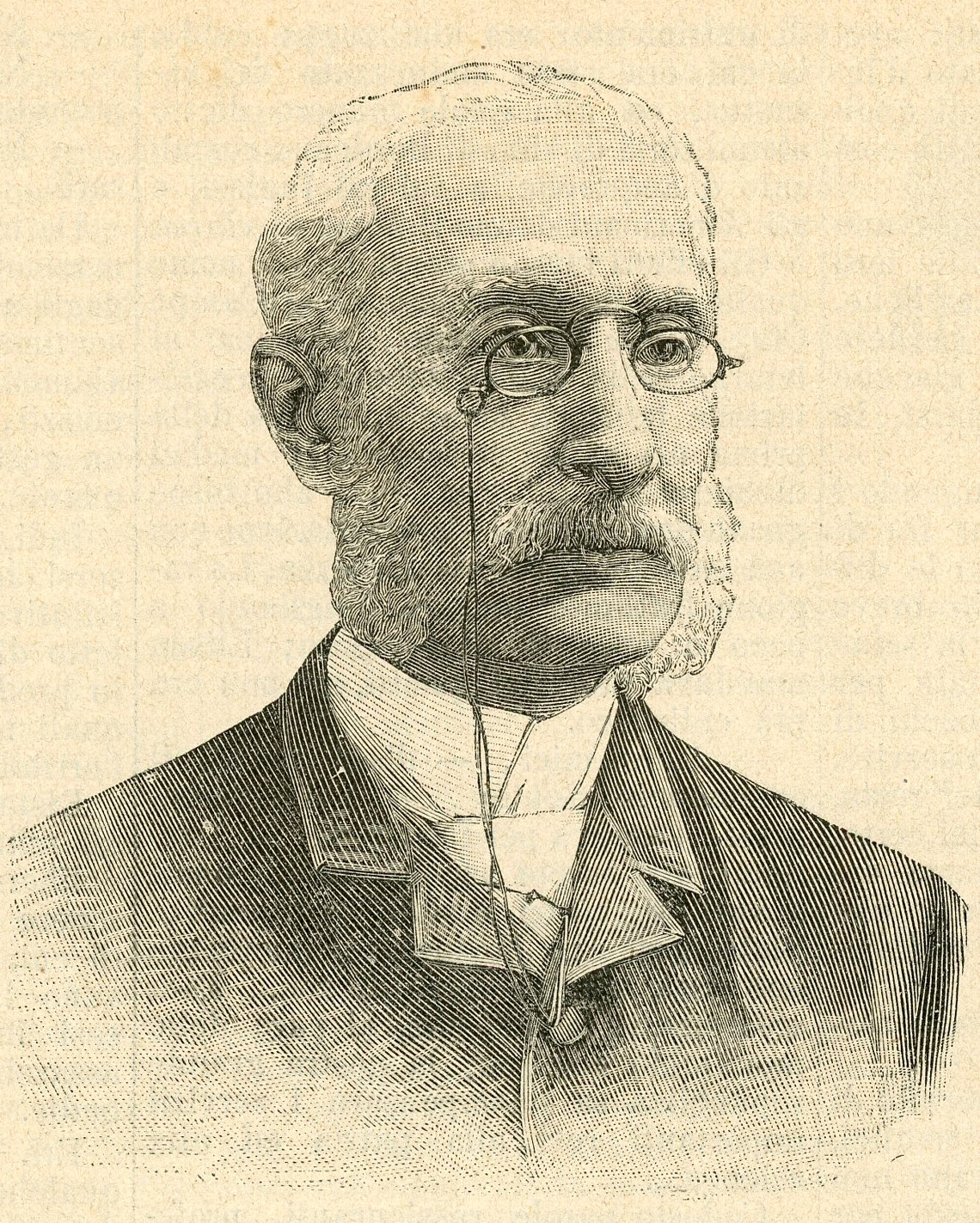

Personal details
- Born: July 3, 1832 Salerno
- Died: 2 October 1913 (aged 81) Salerno
- Education: University of Naples

Baron Francesco Saverio Fava (1832–1913) was known for his founding of the Italian Ministry in Washington, D.C. He served as the first Italian Ambassador of the then recently unified Italy to the United States from 1881 to 1893.

== Biography ==
As Ambassador, Baron Fava served as the Dean of the Diplomatic Corps. Prior to his service for Italy in the United States of America, Baron Fava served in Brazil and Romania. He began his career under the House of Bourbon governments of Italy but as Italian unity formed under Garibaldi, he continued to serve Italian interests under the Savoy.

His greatest challenge as US ambassador consisted of the "New Orleans Affair" in which eleven Italians were lynched by a New Orleans mob on 15 Mar 1891. Lodging a protest with Secretary of State James Blaine and eventually negotiating directly with President Benjamin Harrison, the Baron requested federal action to address a lynching of the eleven Italian citizens being managed as a State of Louisiana criminal event. Several Italians were lynched in a New Orleans jail after being falsely accused of a murder. The local and state government failed to act in a test of federal treaties. The Ambassador withdrew from the US in protest and returned to Italy. His return a year later to the US was celebrated as a demonstration of Italian-US relations being restored to "full harmony" Despite resolution of the New Orleans affair, the Ambassador again faced similar circumstances later in his career with the lynching of Italian citizens at Tallulah, LA with strong protests to then Secretary of State John Hay and President William McKinley. In 1898 he was named by king Umberto I senator of the kingdom.

== Honors ==
Grand Officer of Saints Maurice and Lazarus

Commander of the Order of the Crown of Italy

== See also ==
- Ministry of Foreign Affairs (Italy)
- Foreign relations of Italy
