= Vincenzo Macchi di Cellere =

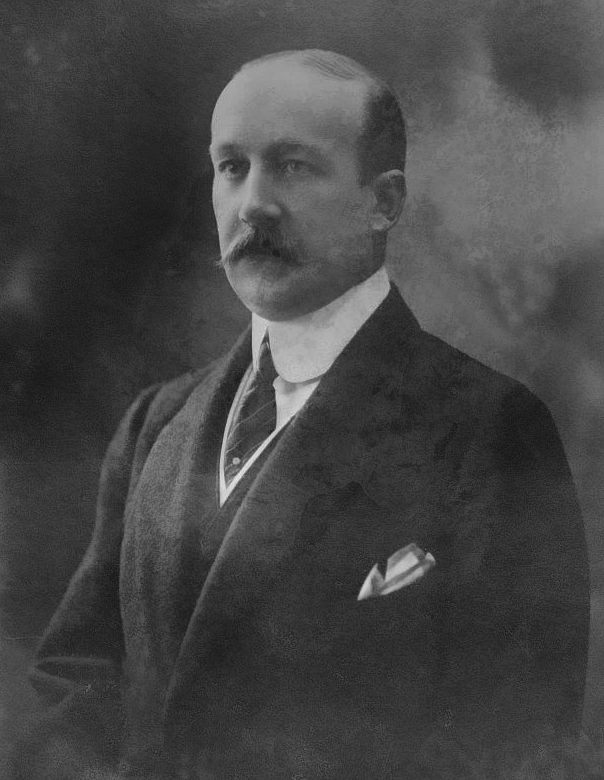

Vincenzo Macchi di Cellere (October 28, 1866 - October 20, 1919) was a Count and the Italian Ambassador to Argentina from 1907 to 1912 and Italian Ambassador to the United States in 1914 to 1919.

== Biography ==
He was born on October 28, 1866. He was the Italian Ambassador to Argentina from 1907 to 1912. He was the Italian Ambassador to the United States from 1914 to 1919.

He died during an operation on October 20, 1919, in Washington, D.C., of mesenteric ischemia.

His remains were returned home on board the USS North Dakota.

== See also ==
- Ministry of Foreign Affairs (Italy)
- Foreign relations of Italy
