= Piero Sartogo =

Italian architect (1934–2023)

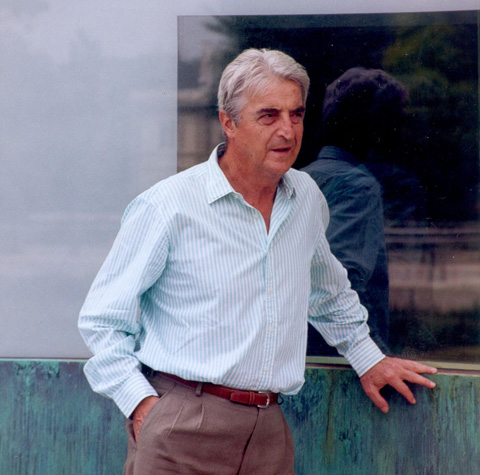
- Sartogo in 2010
- Born: 6 April 1934; Rome, Kingdom of Italy
- Died: 11 March 2023 (aged 88); Rome, Italy
- Occupation: Architect

Piero Sartogo (6 April 1934 – 11 March 2023) was an Italian architect and art theorist.

== Life and career ==
Born in Rome, in 1959 Sartogo graduated in architecture at the Sapienza University, and then made an apprenticeship in the studio of Walter Gropius. His first important work was the building of the Order of Physicians in Rome, a building with disjointed form, which re-creates the image of a tree with its branches. Other important Sartogo's works are the Church of the Holy Face of Jesus in Rome, the Embassy of Italy, in Washington, D.C., the Banco di Roma building in New York, the OECD headquarters in Paris and the Tenuta Ammiraglia-Frescobaldi in Montiano. He was also the worldwide official designer of all Bulgari showrooms. The founder together with his life partner Nathalie Grenon of Sartogo Architetti Associati, with offices in Rome and New York, Sartogo took part in various expositions and fairs, including the Tsukuba Expo 85, the Seville Expo '92 and the Genoa Expo '92.

Sartogo was also an art theorist, best known for the essay Immagine Reale e Virtuale ("Real and Virtual Image"). He served as professor of architecture in his alma mater and as visiting professor in a number of foreign universities including the Columbia University, the Cornell University, the University of Virginia, the University of Pennsylvania, and the University of California. He died in Rome on 11 March 2023, at the age of 88.
