= Germany–Italy relations =

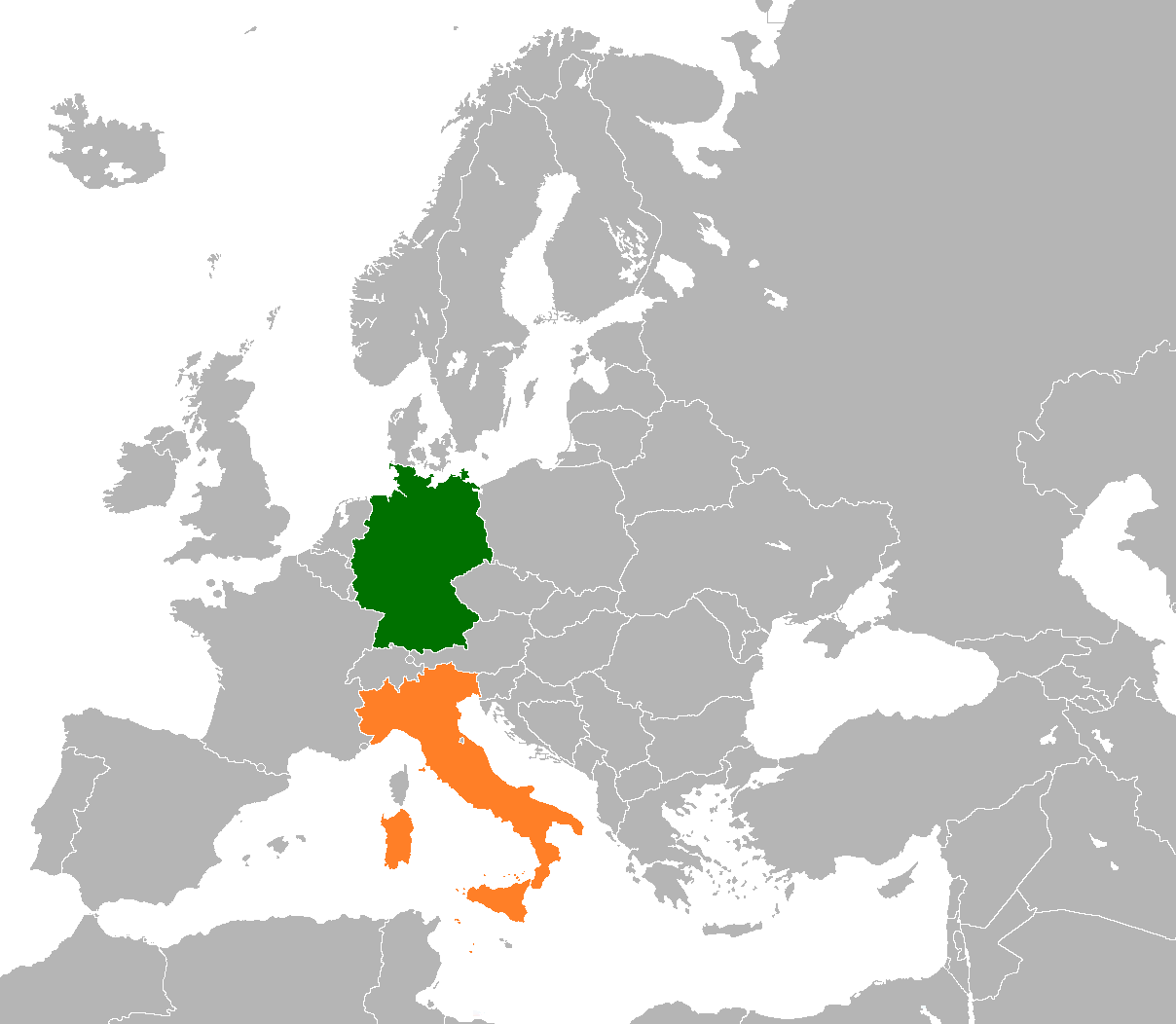

- Germany: Italy

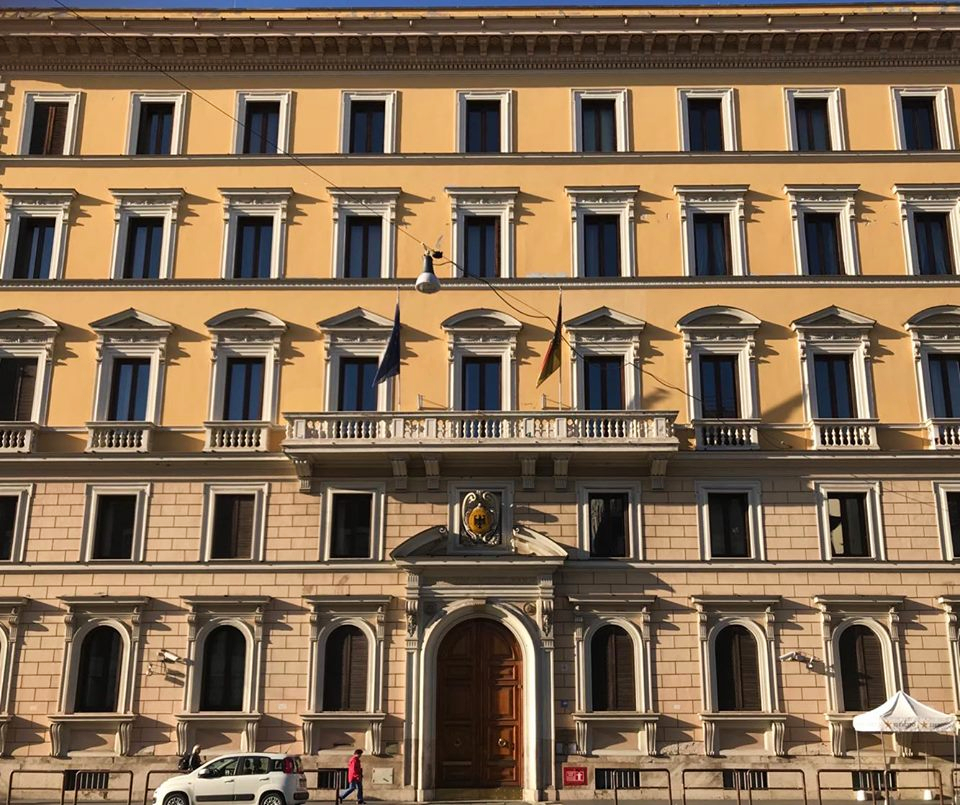
Embassy of Germany in Rome

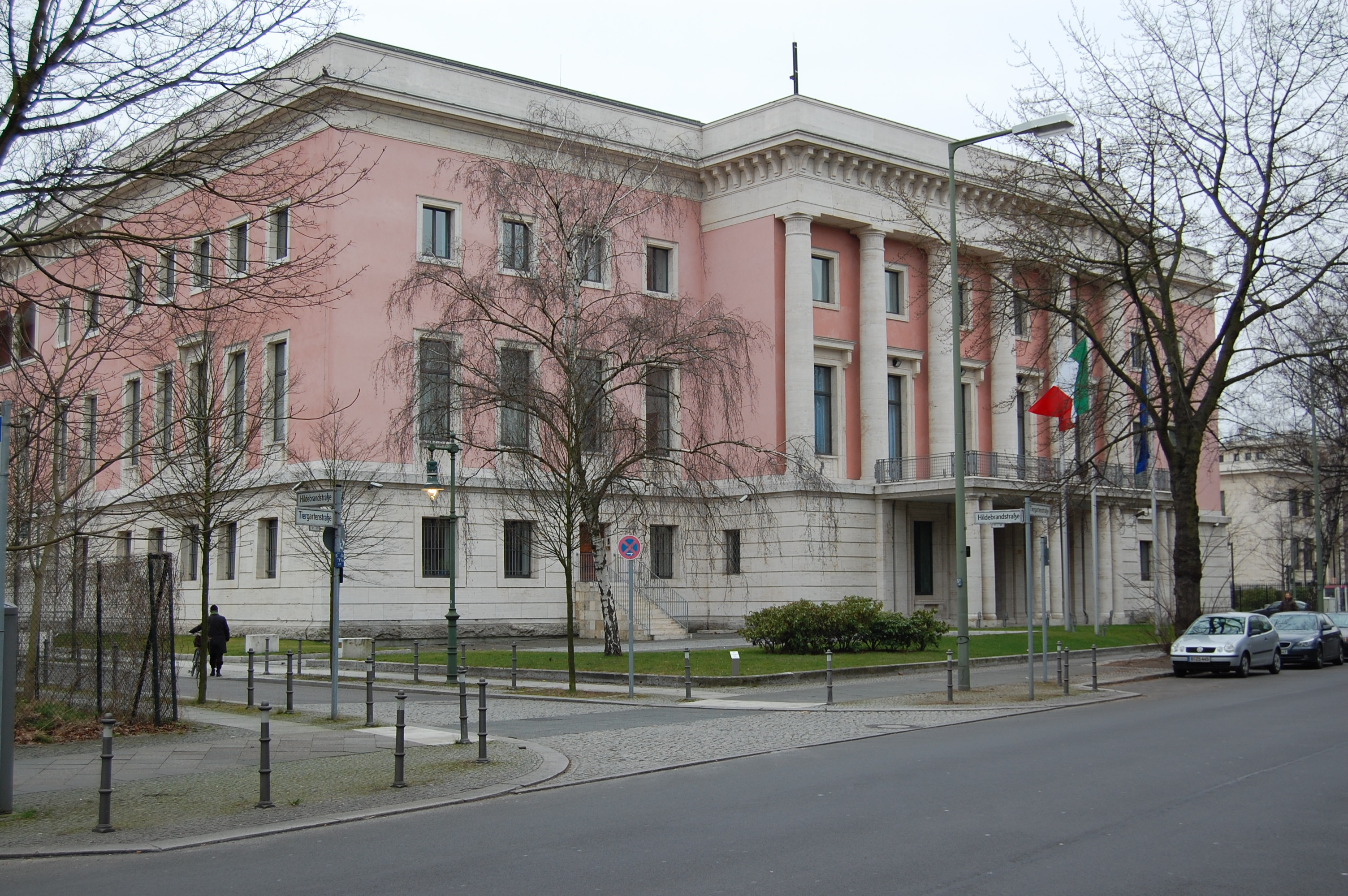
Embassy of Italy in Berlin

Germany and Italy maintain bilateral relations. Both countries are full members of the European Union, Council of Europe, Organization for Security and Co-operation in Europe, and NATO. Germany has an embassy in Rome and consulates in Milan and Naples, while Italy has an embassy in Berlin and consulates in Cologne, Frankfurt, Freiburg, Hamburg, Hanover, Munich, Nuremberg, Saarbrücken, and Stuttgart.

== History ==
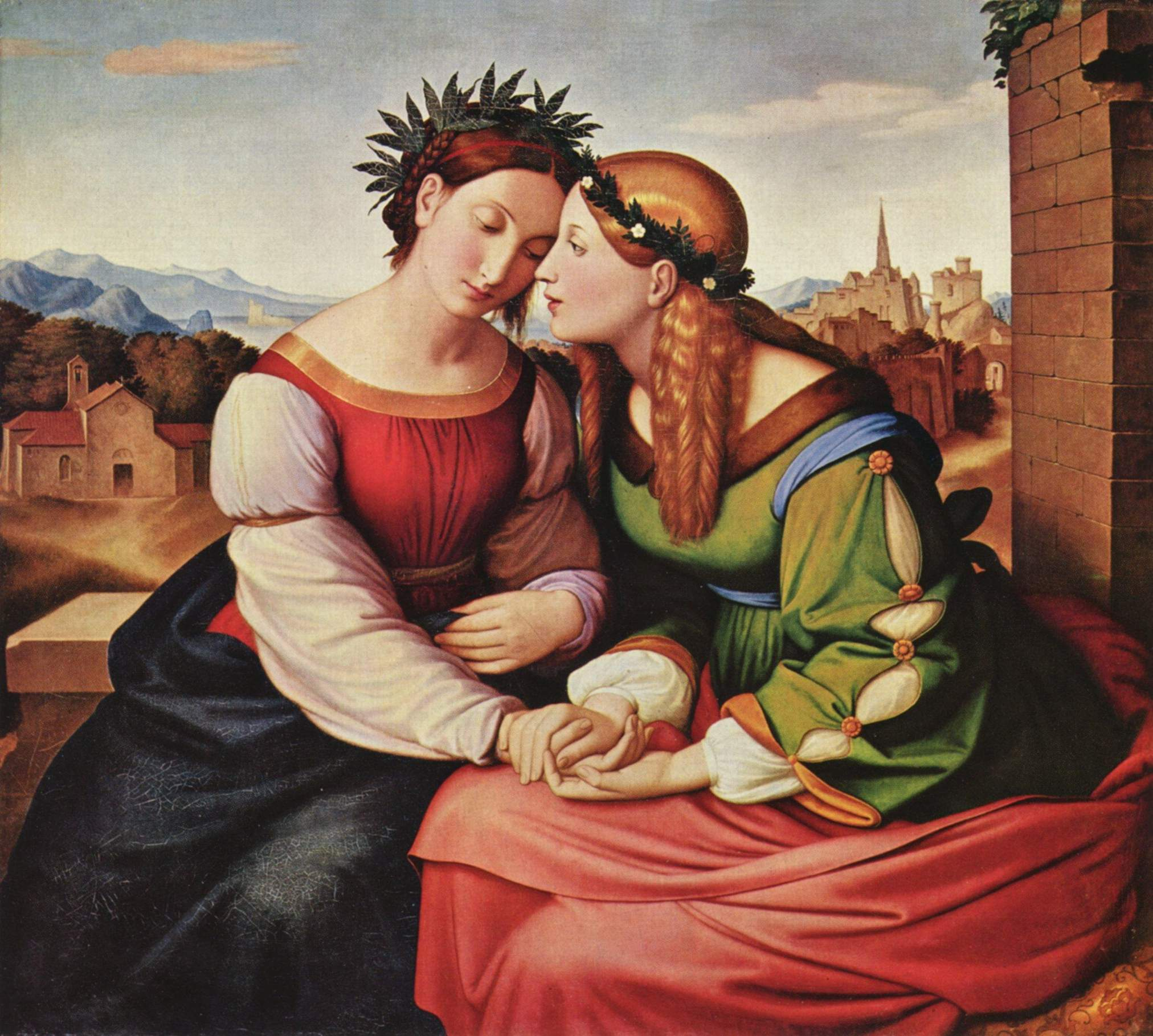
Italia und Germania, painted by Johann Friedrich Overbeck before Italian and German Unification.

Relations were established after the Unification of Italy. The two countries historically enjoy a special relationship since they both formed the Triple Alliance along with the Austro-Hungarian Empire and fought together against France, while parts of their respective territories belonged to the Holy Roman Empire and the German Confederation. Italy and Germany were both part of the Triple Alliance but they became enemies during World War I. Both countries eventually became members of the Axis powers during World War II, formed an alliance during the Cold War (West Germany), were among the inner six and became two of the G6 nations after their economic miracle.

Prime Minister Giulio Andreotti was not in favor of the German reunification but today the Italian government and the German one are full and leading members of the European Union. In 2005, a German cardinal was elected Bishop of Rome.

=== Early relations ===
In 57 BC, Julius Caesar began the Gallic War; his successor Emperor Augustus and his successors extended the borders of the Roman Empire across the Rhine (see also Limes and Germania superior). The rise of the Franks began with the migration Period and the fall of the Western Roman Empire.

Large parts of what would later become Italy and Germany were part of Charlemagne's Frankish Empire in the 8th and 9th centuries AD. Even after the division of the Frankish Empire (843), the connections did not break off: throughout the Middle Ages, large parts of northern Italy were part of the Holy Roman Empire (even if in some cases only formally as the Kingdom of Italy), while intensive – albeit rarely conflict-free – relations also existed between the Papal States in central Italy and the Pope and the Roman-German Emperor. One example is the visit to Canossa (1077) by the Roman-German emperor Henry IV, who wanted to have his excommunication lifted by the pope who was staying there (Investiture Controversy). Although southern Italy was not part of the Holy Roman Empire, it was ruled by the Hohenstaufen dynasty from 1194 to 1268, who also ruled the Holy Roman Emperors. Palermo was the capital and residence of Emperor Frederick II, who grew up in the south.

Starting in Italy in the late 14th century, the new intellectual movements (the Renaissance and Humanism) spread throughout Europe and also influenced the German-speaking world. With Charles V (1516–1556 'Carlos I of Spain'), a German emperor once again attempted to become heavily involved politically and militarily in Italy. One consequence of this was the Sacco di Roma of 1527, when a rebellious army, including German lansquenets, devastated and plundered the 'eternal city'.

The coalition wars began in 1792. In March 1796, Napoleon was given supreme command of the French Italian army by the French Directory and began the Italian campaign. In the preliminary peace treaty of Leoben (signed on April 18, 1797 and ratified on May 24), Austria had to renounce the Duchy of Milan, among other things, and be prepared to settle the conflict with France that had been ongoing since 1792. The treaty of Campo Formio was signed on October 17, 1797; in it, Napoleon forced the end of the Republic of Venice, which had existed since the 7th/8th century. In 1806, he forced the end of the Holy Roman Empire (which had existed since the 10th century) and the renunciation of the empire's imperial feudal rights in Italy. Although Europe was able to free itself from Napoleonic rule in 1814/1815, both German and Italian unification was delayed after the Congress of Vienna in 1815 until around 1870. However, the Italian states were largely ruled by foreign powers, while the German lands were mostly ruled by native rulers. The Austrian Empire ruled Veneto and Lombardy.

=== After 1848 ===
1848 saw the beginning of the German revolutions of 1848–1849 in the German states and the Italian March Revolution in the Italian states, both of which failed. In 1861, the Kingdom of Italy was formed, which in 1866 used the German War between Prussia and Austria on Prussia's side to gain Veneto and Friuli from Austria in the Third Italian War of Independence (after Lombardy had already been won in the Second Italian War of Independence in 1859). The victory against Austria was an important stage in the German unification wars for Prussia and its Prime Minister Otto von Bismarck, as Austria was ousted from German politics, enabling the North German state to win the Austro-Prussian rivalry. While the last German war of unification against France in 1870/71 led to the foundation of the German Empire, the Italians took advantage of the war-related withdrawal of French protection troops to annex the Papal States and declare Rome the Italian capital, thus incorporating the papal domains into the new nation state.

Italy primarily supported Britain and France. The Italian government under Agostino Depretis sought leverage through the international nature of Egyptian finances and the Suez Canal, aligning itself with Britain's aims in Egypt while also supporting France's interests in the region. France, discerning an opportunity to counterbalance British influence, collaborated with Germany through a limit mutual understanding.

However, Italian irredentism remained virulent. This ideology, which called for all Italians to be united in one state, was directed against Austria, which still ruled over Trentino and Istria, as well as other regions. As a result, the Triple Alliance between the German Empire, Austria-Hungary and Italy had little political impact. When the First World War broke out, Italy initially remained neutral and then entered the war in 1915 on the side of Germany's and Austria's opponents, as it felt it could better pursue its irredentist interests in this way (see Treaty of London (1915)).

The 1914 Septemberprogramm authorized by German Chancellor Theobald von Bethmann Hollweg proposed the creation of a Central European Economic Union, comprising a number of European countries, including Germany and possibly Italy, in which, as the Chancellor secretly stressed, there was to be a semblance of equality among the member states, but in fact it was to be under German leadership to stabilize Germany's economic predominance in Central Europe, with co-author Kurt Riezler admitting that the union would be a veiled form of German domination in Europe (see also: Mitteleuropa). The plan failed amid Germany's defeat in the war.

=== Between 1918 and 1938 ===
In the 1919 Treaty of St. Germain, the Kingdom of Italy was awarded the previously Austrian territories of Trentino, South Tyrol, the Channel Valley, the entire former Austrian coastal region and part of Carniola, the city of Zadar and some northern Dalmatian islands. Nevertheless, Italy received less than it had expected (the Entente and Italy had negotiated territorial gains in 1915 as a "reward" for a change of front in the First World War). After all, South Tyrol, a territory traditionally populated by German speakers, was now part of the Italian state. In October 1922, the Fascists led by Benito Mussolini took advantage of the political situation after the War to march on Rome and subsequently establish a dictatorship. As a result, the German-speaking South Tyroleans, along with other victim groups, suffered massively under the fascist policy of Italianization (see Italianization of South Tyrol).

Bundesarchiv Bild 102-12474, Berlin, Reichskanzlei, Empfang

After the National Socialist seizure of power in January 1933, Italy drew closer to Germany, although Mussolini sought to ally himself with Great Britain and France as late as 1935 in the agreement known as the Stresa Front in addition to the Italo-Soviet Pact directed against Germany. The emerging Nazi state took Fascist Italy as a model in some areas.

Other important points in German-Italian relations in these years were the joint intervention in the Spanish Civil War (1936-1939), the annexation of Austria to Germany in 1938, which Mussolini ultimately accepted (South Tyrol remained with Italy; according to the Hitler-Mussolini Agreement, the German-speaking South Tyroleans could only choose between resettlement in the German Reich or giving up their culture and mother tongue) and the alliance treaty of May 22, 1939, known as the Pact of Steel.

=== German–Italian relations, 1939–43 ===
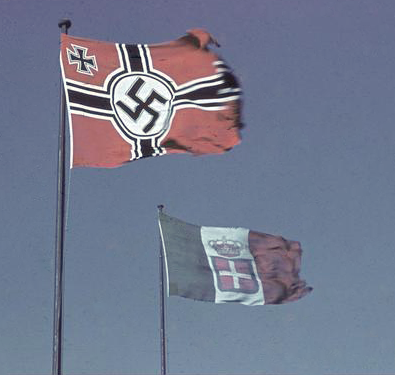
Reichskriegsflagge with the Flag of Fascist Italy (1943)

Before the eruption of World War II the Italian government, led by Benito Mussolini, established The Pact of Steel with Adolf Hitler's German government in efforts to establish a unified military entity to combat the Allied Powers. Although both sides established a governmental agreement, Italy and Germany remained fearful and distrustful towards one another. This distrust between the two governments would often contradict their military actions of unison to being ones aimed against one another. In 1940 the original bipartite pact between Germany and Italy would be expanded by adding Japan, becoming the Tripartite Pact. In June 1940, as the French government fled to Bordeaux, Paris was declared an open city. Mussolini felt that the conflict would end soon and thus declared war on Britain and France. He said to the Italian Army Chief-of-Staff, Pietro Badoglio:

I only need a few thousand dead so that I can sit at the peace conference as a man who has fought.

Mussolini also set his own priorities, which often became a strategic problem for the German Wehrmacht (for example the completely failed Italian attack on Greece in 1940 forcing Germany to intervene). After Italy entered the war, pressure from Nazi Germany caused the internment of some of Italy's Jewish refugees in the Campagna concentration camp.

=== Relations and negotiations between Adolf Hitler and Benito Mussolini ===
Hitler and Mussolini met on ten occasions (see below) during the war, though usually only for individual meetings of a few hours each. As a result, the highest political echelons of both countries never fully coordinated their war goals, strategy and force distribution, and military, political, and ideological jealousies and rivalries persisted between 1939 and 1943.

The first wartime conference between Hitler and Mussolini took place on 18 March 1940, during Italian neutrality and before Germany had accelerated the Italian entry with its May/June 1940 progress against France. A second meeting took place on 18 June 1940 to discuss the peace terms for the Armistice of 22 June 1940 and the Franco-Italian Armistice. A third meeting, this time at the Brenner Pass on 4 October 1940, included discussions about the potential future roles of Francoist Spain and Vichy France in the Axis Powers. The two dictators met a fourth time soon after, on 28 October, discussing the Greco-Italian War which had been unleashed by the Italian army on the same day.

A fifth conference, and the first of the year 1941, took place at the Berghof on 19 January 1941 to further adjust joint action to relieve the Italian peril in the Mediterranean theater, though the Germans did not yet inform their Italian partners of their acute preparations for their June 1941 invasion of the Soviet Union. A sixth meeting happened on 2 June 1941. Although the Italian intelligence agencies had in the interim become definitively aware of Barbarossa, the Germans still chose to not disclose it officially to the Italian leaders. This step was only conducted on the night of 21/22 June, i.e. the morning of the invasion, when Otto Christian von Bismarck transmitted Hitler's lengthy explanation by letter to Galeazzo Ciano.

In 1942, the two leaders met for the seventh time in Salzburg on 29/30 April 1942, discussing the process of the joint war effort in North Africa and the prospect of Unternehmen Herkules, the planned invasion of British-controlled Malta.

An eighth meeting was conducted at Salzburg-Klessheim between 7 April and 10 April 1943. Hitler instructed Heinrich Himmler to provide the Italians advisory assistance in the creation of Schutzstaffel-esque formations in the Italian military, whereas Mussolini unsuccessfully attempted to influence Hitler to seek a negotiated peace with the Soviet Union. Hitler and Mussolini met for a ninth conference in Feltre on 19 July 1943. With the final defeat of the Axis in May 1943 and the Allied process in the ongoing invasion of Sicily (Operation Husky), the prospect of an Allied invasion of mainland Italy had turned acute.

Shortly after the ninth meeting of 19 July, Benito Mussolini was arrested on the decision of the Grand Council of Fascism and interned at the Gran Sasso d'Italia, from where he was subsequently freed by German commandos in the Gran Sasso raid. For the tenth and final conference between the two dictators at Salzburg-Klessheim on 22/23 April 1944, Mussolini had already been installed as the leader of the Italian Social Republic (see below). The two men saw each other for a final time on 20 July 1944 in the immediate aftermath of the Stauffenberg assassination attempt, when Mussolini paid the injured Hitler a consolation visit, though this did not constitute a diplomatic conference. Between July 1944 and their deaths in April 1945, Hitler and Mussolini did not see each other again.

=== Italian Social Republic ===
In 1943, members of the Grand Council voted against Benito Mussolini's political power and demanded his resignation. The decline in support from Mussolini's government was viewed as being rooted in the betrayal of his closest advisers and aides. During this time Victor Emmanuel stripped the Prime Ministerial powers of Mussolini and demanded his arrest. While arrested Mussolini was forced to the island of Ponza and placed as a political prisoner. Soon after Mussolini was sent to the Mt. Gran Sasso where German soldiers made a daring attempt in rescuing him and bringing him to Adolf Hitler. During this time Hitler sought to regain Mussolini's political support back into Italy's government. Just after a short time of Mussolini's demise those that allied against and caused his fall from power were trialed and executed. In efforts to regain a hold on the Italian government Hitler sought to establish the Italian Social Republic, a puppet republic in the town of Salo, in which he encouraged Mussolini to rally political support in efforts to fight against allied forces. Mussolini, who was once a sovereign leader, was now seen as a puppet in the hands of the German government. Germany committed war crimes in occupied Italy.

=== Post-World War II ===
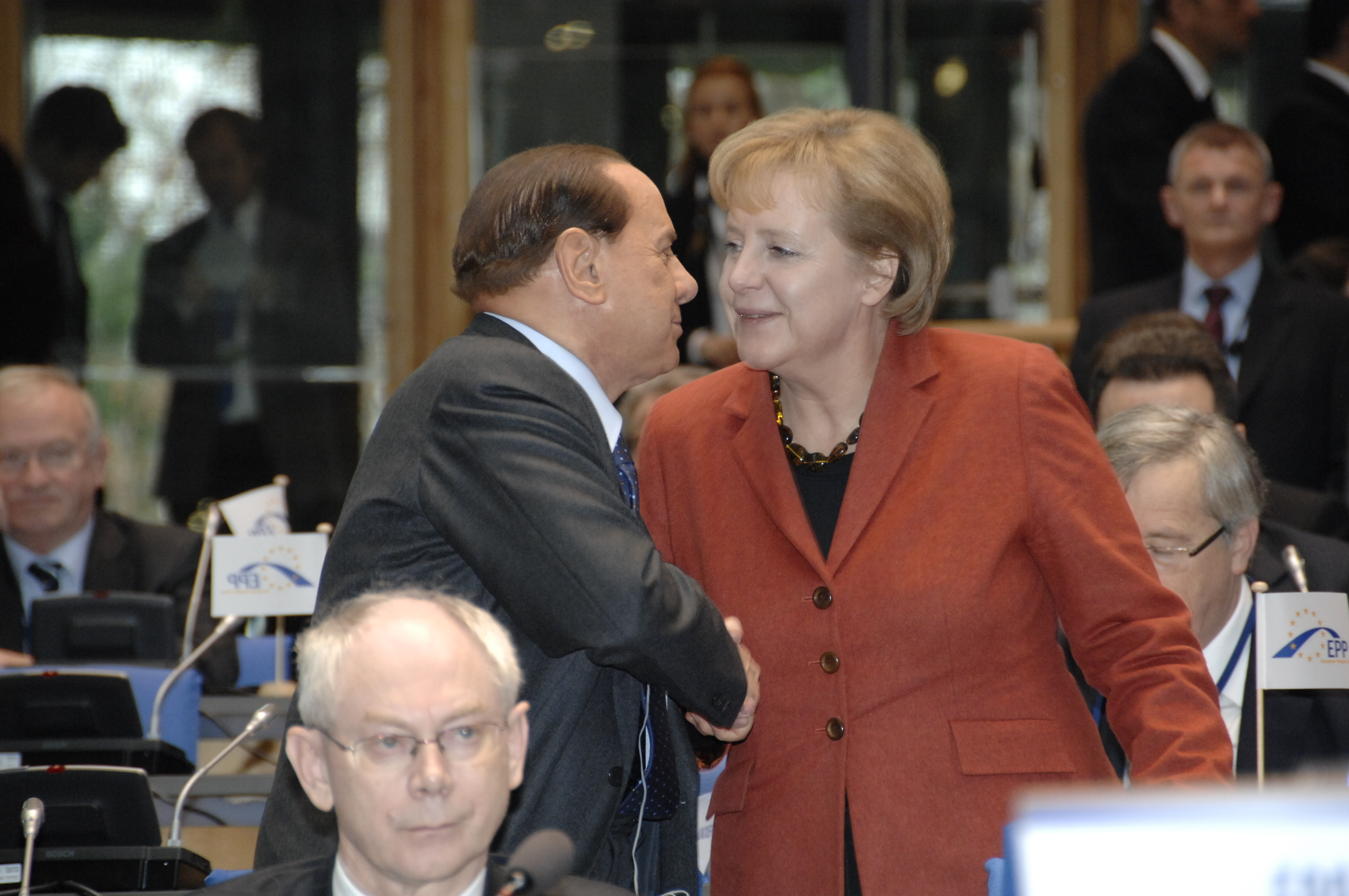
Silvio Berlusconi with Angela Merkel (2009)

After the two world wars, Italy under Alcide De Gasperi and Germany (1949 to 1963 under Konrad Adenauer) were among the founding fathers of a united Europe (1951/52: European Coal and Steel Community), which was also intended to serve the reconciliation of the two peoples. Although there was an economic miracle in both countries in the post-war period, the south of Italy in particular remained underdeveloped; after a recruitment agreement (1955), many Italians tried their luck in West Germany as immigrants. For the German-speaking South Tyroleans, the 2nd Statute of Autonomy from 1972 created a viable solution by giving South Tyrol extensive autonomy within Italy. Today, South Tyrol sees itself as a bridge between the German-speaking and Italian-speaking Europe. During the Cold War, Italy and West Germany were NATO allies.

=== 21st century ===
The modern relationship between Germany and Italy is largely characterized by friendship and mutual European partnership. During the euro crisis from 2009/10, which also massively affected Italy, tensions arose in bilateral relations. At a press conference in 2011, Angela Merkel and Nicolas Sarkozy only responded with a smile when asked whether they still trusted Italian Prime Minister Silvio Berlusconi, who resigned in November 2011, under pressure from other EU countries. Since 2012, the German-Italian relationship has been rather clouded by the euro crisis. After Merkel called on Italy and France to undertake more economic reforms in December 2014, various politicians from both Italy and France refused to give Germany either criticism or advice. After Germany forced southern European states to a hard economic austerity policy, one German business correspondent reporting from Rome since 1992 wrote in 2015:

In the barrage of Italian media, the Germans are nevertheless portrayed as power-hungry and as obsessed with austerity that is making Italy poor. It is no wonder that in a recent survey, 54 per cent of Italians described Germany as their greatest enemy. [...] [T]here is no interest in the concerns of German savers, and economic data is deliberately ignored. What was promised to the Germans in order for Italy to be accepted into the monetary union has long been forgotten. Italy is pleased to see the ECB's new flood of money as a triumph over Germany - and is demanding even more. There is no understanding of the German frustration that the Euro-Mark has now finally been exchanged for the Euro-Lira. In Germany, faith in treaties is being shattered by the cynical pragmatism of Italian day-to-day politics.

Der Spiegel pointed out in April 2020 that many Germans had a false perception of Italian fiscal policy. Germany's reputation in Italy tanked with the COVID-19 pandemic, and thus accusations of a lack of European solidarity on Germany's part became louder. Die Zeit wrote in May 2020:

If [...] Germany then imposes a ban on the export of medical supplies to Italy, even though the death toll there has already skyrocketed, or if there is a dispute for weeks about whether the rich north of Europe should help the poorer south financially with reconstruction or not, then there is not much left of the idea of European values and European solidarity. At the moment, at least, according to surveys, Italians see China as their greatest friend and Germany as their greatest enemy. We will have a lot to do to repair the serious damage. Reconstruction must also be cultural and political, not just economic.

In 2026, Germany and Italy argued about migrants landing in Italy and moving on to Germany. While Germany insisted that the migrants were Dublin cases and therefore fell into Italian responsibility and had to be taken back, Italy argued that some of the migrants had been ferried to Italy by German-flagged NGO vessels in the Mediterranean Sea in the first place. These ships had in part been directly financed by the German government up to the May 2025 election.

== Economic relations ==
During 2017, Italy's economy was valued as being the seventh largest exporting country in the world, while being ranked tenth among all imports around the world. In 2017, Italy's top importing and exporting partner was Germany at $72.2 billion in imports, while exporting $58.5 billion. At 7.1%, the largest product that Italy imports are cars, while its leading exports are packaged medicaments (medicines) at 4.5%. These being Italy's largest imports, 33% are imported from Germany and 12% are from Spain. Whereas Italy's leading exports in medicines are to Belgium, Luxembourg and Switzerland at a combined 32%, exports to Germany alone are at 9.6%.

== Migration ==
Italians in Germany (2021)

Most Italians who have settled in Germany over the years left their home country in search of work. There are 587,167 (2020) Italian nationals living in Germany, making Germany the country with the most Italian nationals outside Italy after Argentina. Around 800,000 people in Germany have Italian ancestry.

== See also ==
- Foreign relations of Germany
- Foreign relations of Italy
- Germany–Holy See relations
- Germany-Italy football rivalry
- Austria–Germany relations
- Austria–Italy relations
