= Gaetano Cortese =

Italian diplomat

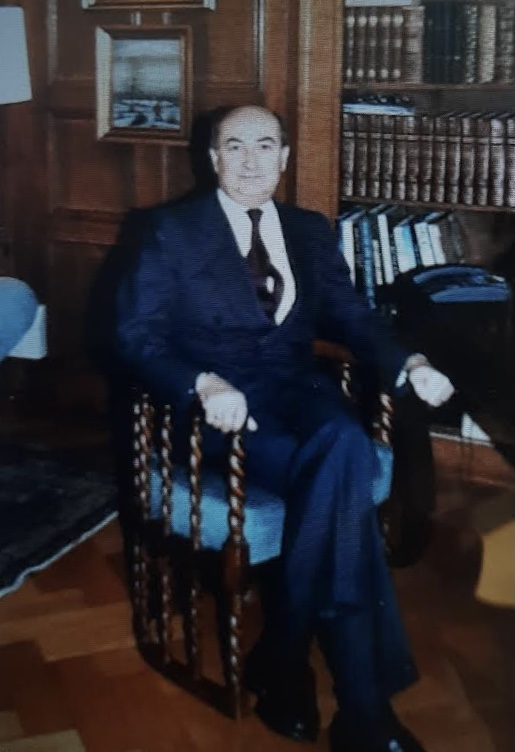
- Ambassador Gaetano Cortese in the Italian Residence in Avenue Legrand, during his diplomatic mission in Brussels, 2002

Ambassador of Italy to the Netherlands
- In office 2006–2009
- President: Giorgio Napolitano
- Preceded by: Mario Brando Pensa
- Succeeded by: Franco Giordano

Ambassador of Italy to Belgium
- In office 1999–2003
- Preceded by: Francesco Corrias
- Succeeded by: Massimo Macchia

Personal details
- Born: 5 February 1942 (age 84) Caltanissetta, Italy
- Education: University of Rome - Sapienza
- Profession: Diplomat, author

Gaetano Cortese (Caltanissetta, 5 February 1942) is an Italian diplomat and ambassador.

== Biography ==
He graduated in Political Science from the Sapienza University of Rome. He entered the diplomatic career in March 1969 and worked at the General Directorate for Emigration and Social Affairs. In April 1971 he was assigned to the Special Secretariat of the Under-Secretary of State. In March 1972, he was appointed Vice Consul in Zagreb, and in January 1975 he became First Commercial Secretary in Bern. In May 1978, he was assigned to the Italian Embassy in Havana. In 1980, he returned to Rome and served in the General Secretariat of the Ministry of Foreign Affairs. In 1984, he was transferred to the Italian Embassy in Washington as First Counsellor for Social Affairs, and in 1989 he was sent to Brussels to the Permanent Representation of Italy to the EEC, as First Counsellor and subsequently Minister Counsellor. In 1990, during Italy's six-month presidency of the Council of the European Economic Community, he was in charge of organising all the social events in Italy and abroad for the Minister of Labour and Social Security, Carlo Donat-Cattin. In 1992, he returned to Rome and was released from his post to serve at the Presidency of the Republic as Adjunct Advisor for Press and Information.

From 1999 to 2003 he was Italian Ambassador to Belgium in Brussels; during his diplomatic mission he prepared and successfully completed the State visit of the President of the Republic Carlo Azeglio Ciampi to the Kingdom of Belgium in October 2002. From 2006 to 2009, he was Italian Ambassador to the Netherlands in The Hague and Permanent Representative of Italy to the Organisation for the Prohibition of Chemical Weapons (OPCW).

He retired in March 2009.

He is the founder and editor of the series of volumes on Italian Embassies in the World by the publisher Carlo Colombo, created in 2000 which published numerous volumes to enhance the architectural and artistic heritage of Italian diplomatic missions abroad. The volumes edited are those relating to the Italian diplomatic offices of Washington DC, Berlin, Brussels, Istanbul, The Hague, Oslo, Vienna, Lisbon, Madrid, Cairo, Stockholm, Copenaghen e The Hague.

== Awards ==
In 2016, he was awarded the 'Culture Prize' by the Circolo della Stampa in Milan as 'recognition' for an achievement 'aimed at enhancing the architectural and artistic heritage of Italian diplomatic offices abroad'.

On 19 April 2018, he received the 2018 Artecom-onlus Prize for Culture for his studies and publications aimed at disseminating knowledge of the cultural heritage, both architectural and artistic and ornamental, present in Italian diplomatic premises.

In 2020 he received the 'Special Prize for Culture' as part of the 'Il Poeta Ebbro' prize awarded at the Spoleto Festival.

On 12 September 2020, he was awarded the Prize for the Enhancement of the Italian Diplomatic Library Heritage in Florence as part of the Premium International Florence Seven Stars 2020.

On 25 June 2022, he was awarded the "Il Diplomatico dell'anno 2022" prize (Diplomat of the year) in Florence.

== Honours ==
Grand Officer of the Order of Merit of the Italian Republic – April 30, 1999

== Publications ==
- La rupture des relations diplomatiques. Paris: thèse de Doctorat, Sorbona. 1968.
- De la Doctrine Hallstein à la Ostpolitik. Paris: Pedone. 1969.
- La fin de la Doctrine Hallstein. Genève: Revue de Droit International. 1971.
- Les canaux internationaux. Genève: Revue de Droit International. 1971.
- La Potenza protettrice nel diritto internazionale. Roma: Edizioni Bizzarri. 1972.
- La rupture des relations diplomatiques et ses consequences. Paris: Pedone. 1972.
- Le statut des troupes francaises stationnées sur le territoire de la République Fédérale d’Allemagne. Paris: Pedone. 1972.
- Le service du volontariat civil. Genève: Revue de Droit International. 1973.
- L’Ambasciata d’Italia a Bruxelles. Roma: Carlo Colombo. 2000. Digital version
- L'Ambasciata d'Italia a L'Aja. Roma: Carlo Colombo. 2007. Digital version
- Il Palazzo di Sophialaan. Roma: Carlo Colombo. 2009. Digital version
- Il Palazzo sul Potomac. The Embassy of Italy in Washington. Roma: Carlo Colombo. 2011. Digital version
- Il Palazzo di Inkognitogaten. L'Ambasciata d'Italia in Oslo. Roma: Carlo Colombo. 2013. Digital version
- Il Palazzo sul Potomac nell'anno della Cultura italiana in USA. Roma: Carlo Colombo. 2014. Digital version
- Villa Firenze.La Residenza dell'Ambasciatore d'Italia a Washington. Roma: Carlo Colombo. 2014. Digital version
- Il Palazzo Metternich nel bicentenario del Congresso di Vienna. Roma: Carlo Colombo. 2015. Digital version
- Il Palazzo Metternich nel 170 anniversario della sua costruzione (1846-2016). Roma: Carlo Colombo. 2017. Digital version
- Il Palazzo sul Tiergarten. L'Ambasciata d'Italia a Berlino. Roma: Carlo Colombo. 2017. Digital version
- L'Ambasciata d"Italia ad Ankara. Roma: Carlo Colombo. 2018. Digital version
- Il Palazzo di Venezia a Istanbul. Residenza dell'Ambasciatore d'Italia. Roma: Carlo Colombo. 2018. Digital version
- Il Palazzo di Avenue Legrand. Residenza dell'Ambasciatore d'Italia presso Sua Maestà il Re dei Belgi. Roma: Carlo Colombo. 2019. Digital version
- Il Palazzo dei Conti di Pombeiro. L’Ambasciata d’Italia a Lisbona. Roma: Carlo Colombo. 2020. Digital version
- Il Palazzo del Marchesi di Amboage. L'Ambasciata d’Italia a Madrid. Roma: Carlo Colombo. 2021. Digital version
- Il Palazzo di Oakhill. L’Ambasciata d’Italia a Stoccolma. Roma: Carlo Colombo. 2021. Digital version
- L’Ambasciata d’Italia in Egitto. Roma: Carlo Colombo. 2021. Digital version
- Il Palazzo di Fredericiagade.L’Ambasciata d’Italia a Copenaghen. Roma: Carlo Colombo. 2022. Digital version
- La Residenza dell’Ambasciatore d’Italia nel Regno dei Paesi Bassi. Roma: Carlo Colombo. 2023. Digital version
