= Giacomo De Martino =

Italian diplomat (1868–1957)

Giacomo de Martino
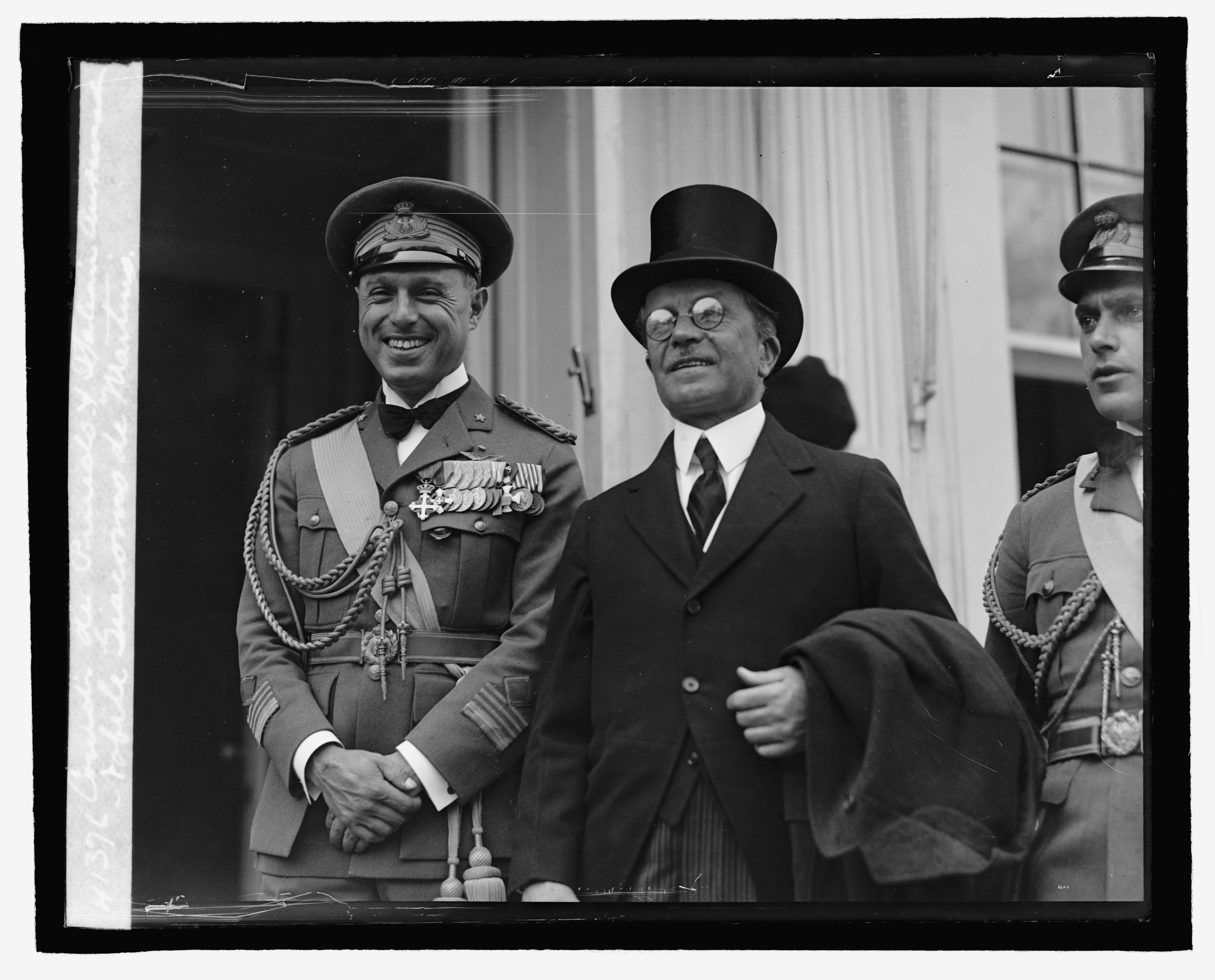

Ambassador of Italy to the United States
- In office 25 January 1925 – 25 August 1932

Personal details
- Born: 7 September 1868 Bern, Switzerland
- Died: 25 June 1957 (aged 88) Rome, Italy
- Education: University of Florence
- Occupation: Diplomat

Baron Giacomo de Martino (7 September 1868 – 25 June 1957) was an Italian diplomat and politician. He was the Envoy of Italy to the United States during the regime of Benito Mussolini.

== Biography ==
Born in Bern, Switzerland to the nobleman Renato de Martino (brother of Giacomo, governor of the colonies) and the Swiss Elisabetta de Wirsen, Giacomo de Martino completed his early studies in the Swiss Confederation before moving to Italy, to Florence, where he graduated in social sciences at the Istituto Cesare Alfieri.

Having embarked on a diplomatic career, de Martino became Head of Cabinet at the Ministry of Foreign Affairs at a very young age (October 1911 – January 1913) and then Secretary General (from 1913 to 1919), although technically he held the rank of Minister Plenipotentiary 1st Class. He was also Secretary General of the Italian delegation to the Paris Peace Conference in 1919.

Promoted ambassador, he was posted to Berlin (1919–20), London (1920–22), Tokyo (1922–25) and Washington (1925–32).

On 23 January 1927, De Martino travelled to Chicago, and spent several days touring the city, addressing the Italian community and explaining Fascism.

While still in his diplomatic career, de Martino was appointed Senator of the Kingdom of Italy in 1928 and remained in the Senate until 1944, when he was declared disqualified along with the other senators considered co-responsible for Fascism. His disqualification was revoked in 1946, but, as the monarchy had ceased to exist, this act was formally ineffective.

With the advent of the Republic, de Martino retired from public life and died in Rome, Italy on 25 June 1957.

== Honours ==
- Grand cordon of the Order of Saints Maurice and Lazarus
- Knight Grand Cross of the Order of the Crown of Italy
