= Nazzareno Carusi =

Italian pianist (born 1968)

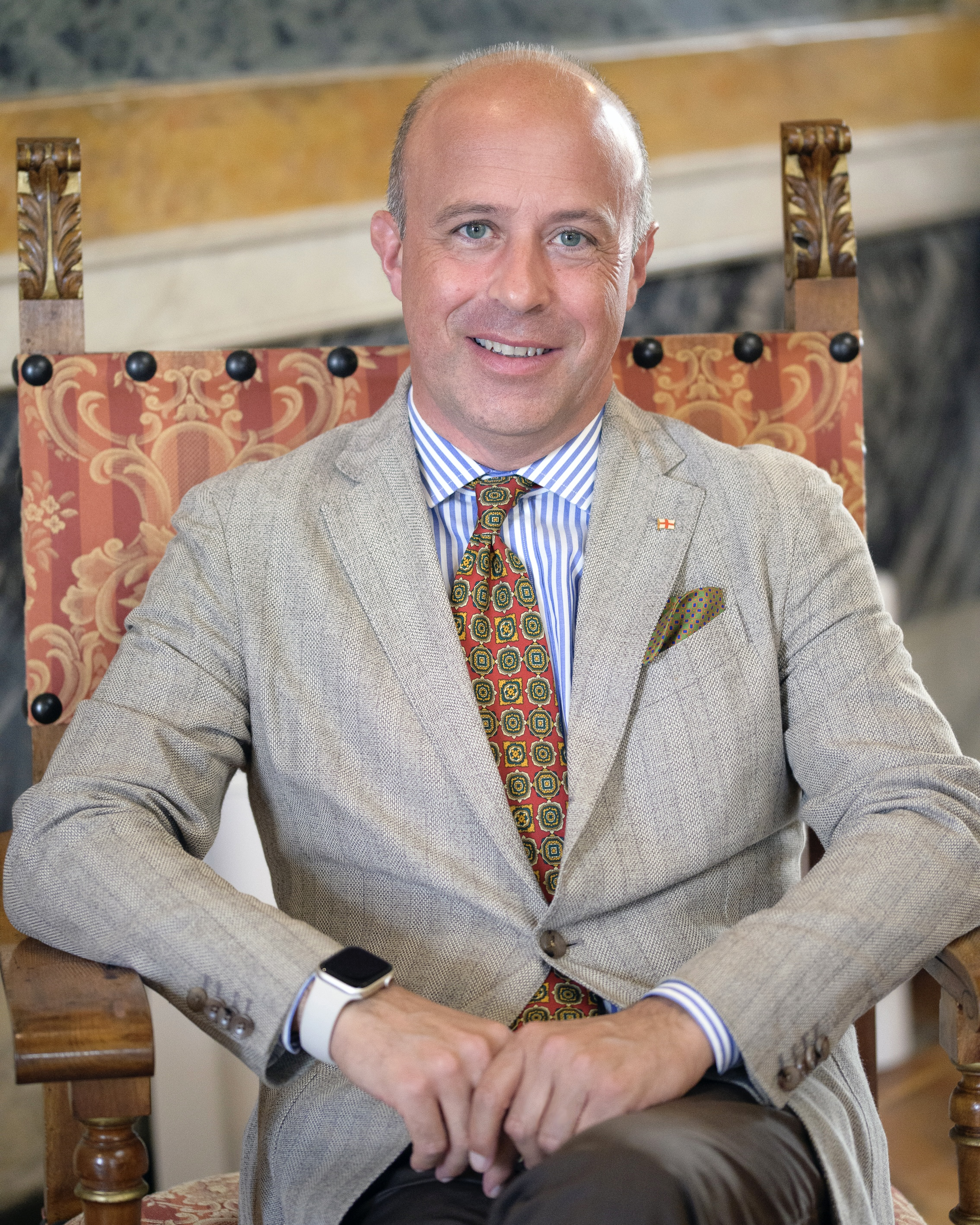

Background information
- Born: 9 November 1968 (age 57); Celano, Italy
- Genres: Classical
- Occupations: Pianist, Artistic director and Cultural manager
- Instrument: Piano

Nazzareno Carusi (born 9 November 1968) is an Italian pianist. A pupil of Alexis Weissenberg and Victor Merzhanov, he also studied with Lucia Passaglia and Adriano Vendramelli. The classical studies with Ugo Maria Palanza and Vittoriano Esposito and the meetings with the Dominican theologian F. Innocenzo Colosio, pupil of Réginald Garrigou-Lagrange, and Isaac Stern were decisive for his formation.

He is considered among the piano virtuosos, in which, however, strong elements of musical research go beyond the mere domain of the keyboard and his pianism has been described either as a synthesis between the Russian school of Gilels and Richter and the German tradition of Claudio Arrau, or as the personal expression of a sovereign musical freedom.

== Biography ==
Riccardo Muti called him "a superlative pianist and a musician of the highest value". In his early twenties, he won the national competition for chairs in the Italian Music Conservatories (1990) and became their youngest professor of "Chamber music". Nowadays, he teaches at Conservatory of Bari. He also won the Réncontres Internationales de Piano in Paris (1999) and the Alexis Weissenberg Prize, awarded by the legendary pianist Alexis Weissenberg himself (1995). He collaborated with Eleonora Buratto, the Philharmonische Camerata Berlin and Mischa Maisky, the Fine Arts Quartet. His live recordings from Teatro alla Scala, from Teatro Colon and from the Jewel Box Series at Northeastern Illinois University of Chicago were released by EMI.

At the turn of the 10s, he was the first classical pianist to sign an exclusive with a main commercial television: Mediaset [10]. He participated with very high ratings in popular programs [11] and the critics recognised him that, despite the "lightness" of these occasions, he gave up nothing of the rigour of the classical artist [12]. He conducted a popular column for Mattino Cinque, some excerpts of which were collected in the album "Petrolio", and he also played with Italian pop and jazz stars like Lucio Dalla, Simona Molinari and Sergio Cammariere. He conceived the melologues "Notturno a Shakespeare" with Pietrangelo Buttafuoco and "Discorso a due" with Vittorio Sgarbi. Finally, he collaborated weekly with the magazine Panorama, the all-news tv channel Tgcom24 and the newspaper Libero. For this commitments, he was awarded the Special Mention of the "Giustiniano Prize" in Ravenna in 2013 [16].

In 2018, the consequences of three vertebral fractures forced him to retire from concert activity and it was the former Secretary of the Italian Council of Ministers Gianni Letta who understood his institutional capacities too and since then started him on the management and artistic direction career.

On February 10, 2021, it was his initiative that led the world of performing arts, for the first time in the history of the Italian Republic, to consultations for the formation of the new government by the appointed Prime Minister Mario Draghi. Today, he is a notable cultural manager, holding the positions of Board Member and Artistic Committee Member of the Teatro alla Scala's Philharmonic Orchestra, President of the "Alfredo Casella" Conservatory of L'Aquila, Vice President of the Foundation "Orchestra Regionale Toscana" of Florence. He has been the artistic director of the 57th Paganini Competition, considered one of the top famous violin competitions in the world, which under his direction has recorded the highest ever subscribers' number since its foundation.

He's engaged with the Italian pharmaceutical chemist Erminia Bianchino, chief of the Nutraceutical Laboratory at BioGeM, and together they have a son, Leone Paolo (2025). He also has three other children: Francesco (2005) , Émilie (2008) and Elisabetta (2013).

== Recordings ==
- Modest Mussorgsky: Pictures at an Exhibition - Nazzareno Carusi Live at Teatro Colon - EMI
- Domenico Scarlatti: Nine Sonatas - Nazzareno Carusi Live in Chicago - EMI
- Wolfgang Amadeus Mozart: Kegelstatt Trio K.498 / Robert Schumann: Three Romances for Oboe and Piano op.94, Märchenerzählungen op.132 - Nazzareno Carusi, Fabrizio Meloni, Danilo Rossi and Francesco Di Rosa Live at Teatro alla Scala - EMI
- Johannes Brahms: Clarinet Sonatas op. 120 - Nazzareno Carusi and Fabrizio Meloni - Amadeus
- Camille Saint-Saëns: Cello Sonata n. 2 in F major op. 123 Luigi Piovano and Nazzareno Carusi - Eloquentia
- "Notturno" - Nazzareno Carusi feat. Sergio Cammariere, Fabrizio Bosso, Karine - EMI
- "Petrolio" - Nazzareno Carusi feat. Fabrizio Meloni, Francesco Di Rosa, Lucio Dalla, Simona Molinari, Fabrizio Bosso - Carosello

== Bibliography ==
- Paolo Isotta, La virtù dell'elefante, Marsilio Editori, Italia, 2014, pp. 131–132,262,455,581, ISBN 978-88-317-1939-1
- Paolo Isotta, Altri canti di Marte, Marsilio Editori, Italia, 2015, pp. 45–48,50-55,89,101-102,105-106,130,236,277, ISBN 978-88-317-2181-3
- Luca Beatrice, Per i ladri e le puttane sono Gesù Bambino. Vita e opere di Lucio Dalla, Baldini & Castoldi, 2016, p. 207, ISBN 978-88-685-2938-3
- Giorgio Dell'Arti, Biografia di Nazzareno Carusi, Cinquantamila - La storia raccontata da Giorgio Dell'Arti, Italia, 2017
- Luca Ciammarughi, Da Benedetti Michelangeli alla Argerich. Trent'anni con i Grandi Pianisti, Zecchini Editore, Italia, 2017, p. 214, ISBN 978-88-654-0187-3
- Luca Ciammarughi, Soviet Piano. I pianisti dalla Rivoluzione d'Ottobre alla Guerra Fredda, Zecchini Editore, Italia, 2018, p. 159, ISBN 978-88-654-0197-2
- Sergio Cammariere, Libero nell'aria, Rizzoli, Italia, 2021, p. 295, ISBN 978-88-171-5509-0
- Carlo Fontana, Sarà l'avventura, Il Saggiatore, Italia, 2023, p. 259, ISBN 978-88-428-3359-8
- Danilo Rossi, Viola d'amore, Baldini&Castoldi, Italia, 2024, p. 129, ISBN 979-12-549-4129-4
