= Oleg Volkov =

Russian pianist

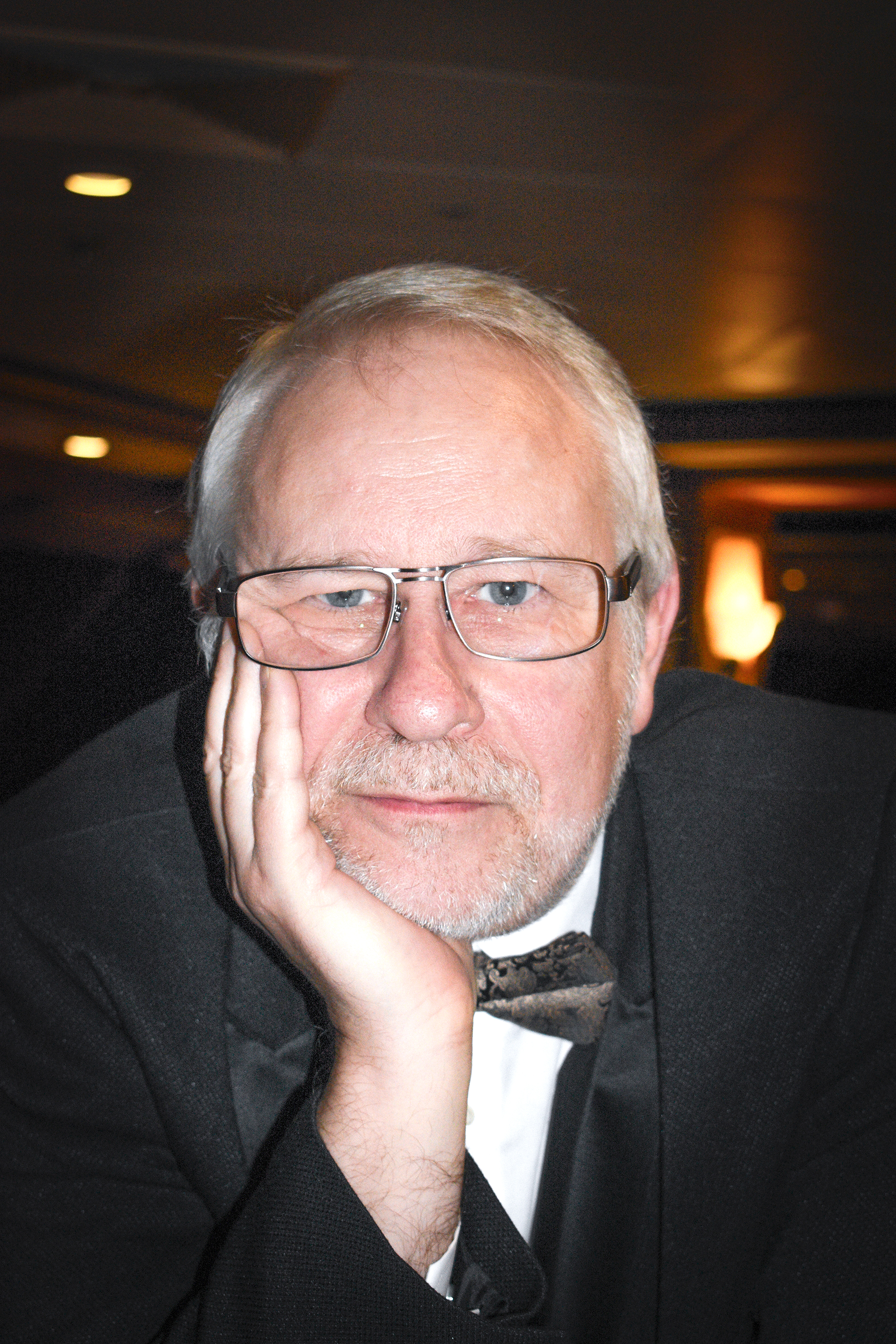

Oleg Volkov (born 1958) is a Russian pianist.

== Early life and education ==
Volkov was born in the south of Russia in 1958. He began his musical studies at the age of seven, studying in Russian music schools, where he graduated with honors. His studies continued at the Moscow Conservatory, entering in 1977, where he studied piano with Victor Merzhanov. After his graduation, with honors, in 1982, he continued his postgraduate studies with Merzhanov, earning a DMA in 1986 with an honors diploma.

== Career ==
Upon completion of his studies, Mr. Volkov was appointed to the position of assistant professor to Maestro Merzhanov, and held this position until leaving for the United States in December 1990. While teaching at the Moscow Conservatory, Volkov split his time between pedagogy and a busy concert schedule enjoying many performances throughout USSR and Europe until his departure for the United States. Numerous successes at the international competitions led to the invitation to join the music faculty at the University of Maryland as a visiting professor. Along with this came praise, respect, and admiration from American critics and audiences alike.

International concert pianist career took Volkov all around the world (from Chile to Japan). He has performed in the most prestigious concert halls including the Great Hall of Moscow Tchaikovsky Conservatory, The Kennedy Center, Lincoln Center in New York, South Bay Center for the Arts in California, as well as Tokyo Bunka Kaikan in Japan, Teatro Cervantes de Malaga in Spain, and many others.

Since settling in the U.S., Volkov has gained critical and popular acclaim as a concert artist and a teacher. He has appeared in concerts in major cities throughout the United States, both as a solo artist and playing concertos with principal orchestras. Strong endorsement by Mstislav Rostropovich resulted in a performance with the National Symphony Orchestra in front of a sold-out crowd of over 5,000 people. Oleg Volkov also gave a Washington, DC premiere performance of Alfred Schnittke's Concerto for Piano and Strings at the Kennedy Center with the National Philharmonic Orchestra.

In 1994, Volkov made a first return to his native country and gave a charitable tour of 14 recitals and orchestra performances along with numerous master classes in his native Russia with all the proceeds having been donated to music institutions to further foster their development. During Mr. Volkov's Moscow visit, Russian radio and television made a 45-minute documentary covering his recital at Moscow Tchaikovsky Hall, his concerto performance at the Great Hall of the Conservatory, a master class and a special interview with the artist. In 1998, Volkov was awarded a prestigious Distinguished Artist of Russia award.

== Critical acclaim ==
A dozen of Volkov's recordings that cover musical styles from Haydn to Schnittke and released on Music Corporation of America (MCA), Melodia (USSR), Fontec (Japan), and Brioso Recordings (USA) labels have gained critical acclaim:

Throughout this recording (BR105) Oleg Volkov displays his usual deft pianistic and technical skills. He makes about the best case imaginable for the lesser pieces and is an excellent interpreter of the highly individual Scriabin preludes and sonata, capturing the mystical and intense nature of the latter piece with keen insight.

— Classical Net, CD Reviews

The Rachmaninov transcriptions (BR106) are full of color and sparkle, full of subtle shadings and impressive virtuosity. Ditto for the Liszt Gnomenreigen. And his Scriabin, as on the other disc, is compellingly rendered.

— Classical Net, CD Reviews

...this is one of the best recordings (BR109) of this (Shostakovich) concerto on the market

— Fanfare, May/June 1996

Mr. Volkov is one of the most promising... pianists.

— NetRadio with Bill Parker - Spotlight CD of the Week, May 25–31, 1997

Volkov's reading is a truly outstanding, revelatory one...

— Classical Net, CD Reviews

Put simply, you're not likely to hear playing with this kind of individual approach in the concert hall or on recordings.

— Classical Net, CD Reviews

What is most noticeable about Volkov here (BR114) is his consummate artistry from first note to last. There is not a measure that passes beneath his fingers without thought or without feeling...Volkov, one might daringly observe, approaches artistic perfection in this performance. In sum, this is one of the finest Rachmaninov Seconds I’ve ever heard.

— Classical Net, CD Reviews

The first pressing of this disc, with Oleg Volkov as soloist and Andrei Tchistiakov conducting the Moscow Philharmonic, sold out completely in three weeks. The performances-fiery, brilliant and deeply poetic deserve this success, and a new pressing is now available. Also available and equally impressive is Volkov's new Beethoven disc ( BR 115), containing Sonatas No. 3 and 16 and shorter works.

— The Washington Post

== Horowitz Steinway tour ==
After the death of Vladimir Horowitz, Oleg Volkov was the first pianist ever to play the Horowitz's Steinway piano in a public concert. The Washington Post wrote of that performance: “…the best work of the evening was the second encore, Schumann's "Trauemerei," played with a gentleness and warmth enhanced by the fine acoustics of the GMU Center for the Arts, a sensitivity and flexibility of phrasing that approached the expressiveness of a human voice. This number was worth the long drive from downtown Washington”. This performance launched a two-year nationwide tour of the Horowitz Steinway Grand where Volkov was a frequent guest artist

Volkov's students are winners of numerous international piano competitions and awards.
