= Guglielmo Imperiali =

Italian politician

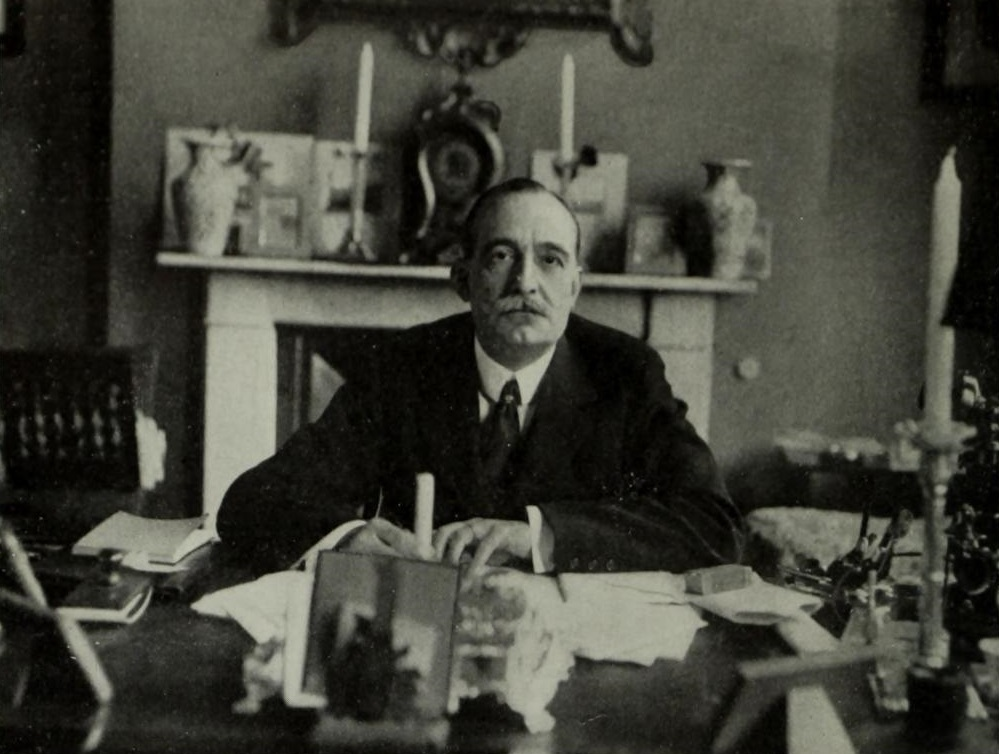
- The Marquis Guglielmo Imperiali

Italian ambassador to Bulgaria
- In office 12 May 1903 – 31 March 1904
- Preceded by: Giorgio Polacco
- Succeeded by: Fausto Cucchi Boasso

Italian ambassador to Turkey
- In office January 1904 – 1909
- Preceded by: Obizzo Malaspina di Carbonara
- Succeeded by: Edmondo Mayor des Planches

Italian ambassador to the United Kingdom
- In office 1910–1920
- Preceded by: Giacomo de Martino
- Succeeded by: Antonino di San Giuliano

Personal details
- Born: 19 August 1858 Salerno
- Died: 20 January 1944 (aged 85) Rome

Marquis Guglielmo Imperiali (19 August 1858 – 20 January 1944) was an Italian nobleman and diplomat. A liberal associated with the political left, he was a scion of the conservative Imperiali family. His most important position was as the Italian ambassador in London during the First World War (1914–18).

== Family ==
Born at Salerno, Imperiali was the second child and first son of the Marquis Francesco Imperiali di Francavilla (1826–1904), from a cadet branch of the Princes of Francavilla, and Clementina Volpicelli, daughter of Pietro Volpicelli, a businessman and landowner, and Teresa Micheroux, from a family of French soldiers established in Naples with King Charles III of Spain. Saint Caterina Volpicelli (1839–1894), a nun and foundress of the Congregation of the Handmaids of the Sacred Heart of Jesus, was his maternal aunt.

== Early career ==
Imperiali attended law school in Naples, graduating in 1880. He joined the foreign service in 1882, and was posted to the United States at the critical moment of the Italian lynchings in New Orleans, following the assassination of police chief David Hennessy in 1890. In October 1895, just before a posting to Brussels, he married Giovanna Maria Colonna (1867-1946), daughter of Edoardo, Prince of Summonte, from a family influential in political and court circles. Between 1901 and 1903 he was in Berlin, serving as head of mission, where he tried to strengthen the Triple Alliance and criticised the German government for recognising the Treaty of Bardo, whereby France had gained control of Tunisia over Italy. After the fall of Foreign Minister Giulio Prinetti, Imperiali was sent to Sofia, capital of Bulgaria. The recent Mürzsteg Agreement (2 October 1903) between Austria-Hungary and Russia was designed to cut the Italians out of the Macedonian Question.

Imperiali served very briefly in Belgrade at the beginning of 1904 before being sent as ambassador to Constantinople. He was moved from there to London, taking up residence in the latter in May 1910. There he had the task of defending the Italo-Turkish War, provoked by Italy, and furthering Italy's Balkan interests in the London Conference of 1912–1913. In December 1913 he was appointed a senator.

== First World War and post-war ==
Although at the start of the World War he preferred neutrality, after Italy and the Triple Entente became allies, he was Italy's negotiator of the Treaty of London (1915), which promised Italy substantial territorial gains in case of victory against Germany and Austria. After the end of the war, he was a member of the Italian delegation to the Paris Peace Conference and a co-signer of the Treaty of Versailles, although his role during this negotiations was less central.

However, in November 1920, due to strong disagreements with the new Italian foreign minister, Carlo Sforza, Imperiali was removed from his post in London, replaced by Giacomo De Martino and mostly excluded from post-war negotiations. In 1921, he was appointed Italy's representative to the Council of the League of Nations and was also involved in humanitarian initiatives like the protection of deported women and children during the Greco-Turkish War.

After the Fascists came to power in 1922, Imperiali left his position at the League of Nations in 1923, but began to attend the Senate more regularly, becoming a prominent member of the opposition and an authority in matters of foreign relations.

In 1932, he was made a knight of the Order of the Most Holy Annunciation, a rare honour for a diplomat. He died in Rome.

== List of honours ==
=== Italian ===
- Knight of the Order of the Most Holy Annunciation
- Knight Grand Cross of the Order of Saints Maurice and Lazarus
- Knight Grand Cross of the Order of the Crown of Italy

=== Foreign ===
- Knight Gran Cross of the Most Honourable Order of the Bath (United Kingdom)
- Commander of the Order of Leopold (Belgium)
- Knight 2nd Class of the Albert Order (Saxony)
- Knight 3rd Class of the Order of the Red Eagle (Prussia)
- Knight of the Order of the Legion of Honour (France)
- Member of the Royal Victorian Order (United Kingdom)
