= Ruslan Sviridov =

Russian pianist (born 1973)

Background information
- Born: Русла́н Валенти́нович Свири́дов; January 18, 1973; Tambov, Russia
- Genres: Classical
- Occupations: Pianist, pedagogue
- Instrument: Piano
- Label: RVS Music
- Website: http://synergyduo.com/ruslan.html

Ruslan Valentinovich Sviridov (Russian: Русла́н Валенти́нович Свири́дов) (born January 18, 1973, in Tambov) is a Russian pianist.

== Education ==
In 1987-1991 studied at Tambov Musical College with Natalia Kolpakova. In 1991-1998 he studied at the Moscow Conservatory in the class of Professor Victor Merzhanov (piano), graduating with distinction.

== Career ==
Sviridov has won many piano competitions in Russia. He achieved international recognition as a pianist in 1994 when he won Grand Prix and a first prize at the Tortona International Musical Competition in Italy. In 1995, he was a prizewinner in the Kingsville International Piano Competition in Kingsville, Texas (USA) and several competitions in Italy.

Widely known among music lovers, Sviridov has given many recitals in Russia, Europe, and the United States. His recordings show his extensive repertoire. In 1996 he formed "Piano Synergy Duo" together with his wife, Irina Khovanskaya. The duo had released three CDs to date.

== Personal life ==
Sviridov moved to San Antonio, Texas (United States) in 1998. He currently resides in Toronto, Canada.
