= Lorenzo Turchi-Floris =

Italian composer

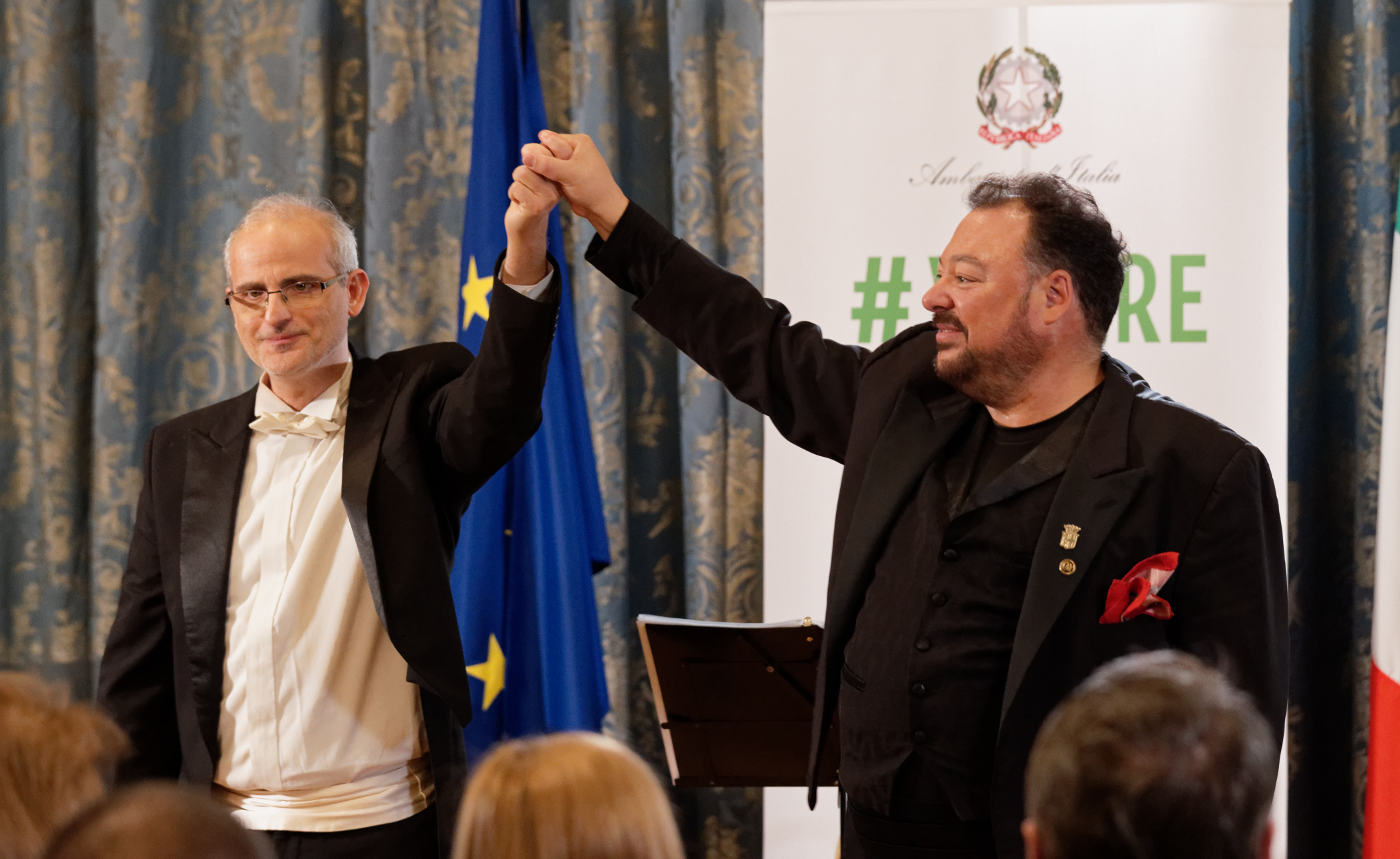
- Maestro Lorenzo Turchi Floris (left) and tenor Carlos De Antonis (2019)

Background information
- Born: Siena, Italy
- Genre: Classical
- Occupations: Musician, Professor
- Instruments: Piano, Conductor, Composer
- Website: lorenzoturchifloris.com

Lorenzo Turchi-Floris is an Italian composer, conductor, pianist and professor.

== Biography ==
He graduated in piano, composition and orchestra conducting at the "Conservatorio di Musica Giuseppe Verdi" (Turin, Italy). He studied piano in Rome with Debora Varesco and then continued his studies in Russia at the Rachmaninov Musical Institute with Viktor K. Merzhanov. He has studied conducting, counterpoint, instrumentation and analysis at the Haute école de musique de Genève.

He is piano professor at the State Conservatory of Music "Giulio Briccialdi" of Terni.

His recordings as a pianist, composer and conductor have been published by Generason (France), SMB (France), Rendre Présent (France), SOTA (USA) and Brilliant Classics (Netherlands).

=== Conductor ===
In 1997 he created the Orchestre Symphonique du Mont-Blanc (OSMB), the first Symphonic Orchestra in the Haute-Savoie region in France. From 1998 to 2013 he has been the artistic director of its Orchestra and Choir.

Since 2008 he is the artistic director of the Musicfor International and he devotes much of his musical activity to the development and support of the most disadvantaged areas in the world (such as Mozambique, Haiti, Angola, South Africa and Ivory Coast) planning music schools.

=== Composer ===
He has composed the music of "Story of a night pianist", a site-specific interdisciplinary performance by Anna Buonomo.

In 2019 he has produced, together with Ambassador Stefano Baldi, a cultural show entitled "Journey in Italy" to get to know some of the Italian Regions through their popular musical tradition arranged in a classical key for tenor and piano.

He has composed the music for the short film "Faraday's Cage" (2014) directed by Terry Braun, "Happiness" directed by Anna Raisa Favale (2014), "Ninna Nulla" (2024) and "Io sono scomparso" (2025) directed by Danilo Pio Ferrara.

=== Awards ===
As a pianist, he has won prizes in several music competitions: Pineto National Competition (1994 - Italy), Tortona International Competition (1994 - Italy), Detroit International Competition (1993 - USA), Rome AIDI Competition (1992 - Italy), Gargano National Competition (1991 - Italy), Matera National Competition (1991 - Italy), Ciampino National Competition (1988 – Italy).

In 2017 he received the “Baton for Peace” award from UNICEF, symbolizing humanitarian commitment, for his efforts to expand access to music for everyone through the international organization Musicfor.

== Works ==
- Resonantia Mediaevalis for guitar and orchestra (2025). Also a version for string orchestra.
- Barricades Mystérieuses for guitar and orchestra dedicated to Dominique Weber (2020)
- Rondo Latino for marimba and string orchestra (2019)
- Evocazioni Notturne for piano and string orchestra (2018)
- Prelude and Fugue for guitar and string orchestra dedicated to Alessio Nebiolo (2017)
- Aspettando Anninora for piano and string orchestra (2016)
- Piece for String Orchestra for string orchestra (2014)
- Ave Maria for choir SATB (2013)
- Tarantango for piano and string orchestra (2012)
- Presentiments for string orchestra (2011)
- Il respiro dei sassi for petit ensemble (2011)
- Tempo di Concerto for piano and string orchestra (2010)
- Venezia for orchestra (1986)
- Two pieces for piano solo (1984)

== Discography (as composer) ==
- Rondo Latino for marimba and string orchestra in "Sound WavesAVES" - Summerfest Chamber Orchestra - SOTA Production (US - 2019)
- Evocazioni Notturne for piano and string orchestra in "The Shape of Music" - Summerfest Chamber Orchestra - SOTA Production (US - 2018)
- Prelude and Fugue for guitar and string orchestra in "Summer Fantasia" - Summerfest Chamber Orchestra - SOTA Production (US - 2017)
- Aspettando Anninora for piano and string orchestra in "Best of the Best" - Summerfest Chamber Orchestra - SOTA Production (US - 2016)
- Presentiments for string orchestra in "Uniting the World" - Mission Chamber Orchestra - Symphony of the Americas - SOTA Production (US - 2014)
- Piece for String Orchestra in "I Musici estensi - Ritorno" - Symphony of the Americas - SOTA Production (US - 2013)
- Tarantango for piano and string orchestra in "RomaAmor" - Mission Chamber Orchestra - Symphony of the Americas - SOTA Production (US - 2012)
- Tempo di concerto for piano and string orchestra in "In Majestic Mont Blanc" - Mont-Blanc Chamber Orchestra - Symphony of the Americas - SOTA Production (US - 2010)

== Discography (as performer) ==
- Antonio Vivaldi in "Antonio Vivaldi" for choir and orchestra - Lorenzo Turchi-Floris, conductor | Chœur and Orchestre Symphonique du Mont-Blanc - SMB Studio Production (FR - 2008)
- Wolgang Amadeus Mozart: Requiem in "Requiem" for choir and orchestra - Lorenzo Turchi-Floris, conductor | Chœur and Orchestre Symphonique du Mont-Blanc - SMB Studio Production (FR - 2007)
- Pëtr Il'ič Čajkovskij: Piano concerto n. 1 op. 23 in "Borodine-Tchaikowsky" for piano and - Lorenzo Turchi-Floris, piano, David John, conductor | Orchestre Symphonique du Mont-Blanc - Generason Production Production (FR - 2007)
- Wolgang Amadeus Mozart: Requiem in "Requiem" for choir and orchestra - Lorenzo Turchi-Floris, conductor | Chœur and Orchestre Symphonique du Mont-Blanc - SMB Studio Production (FR - 2007)
- Carl Orff: Carmina Burana in "Carmina Burana" for choir and orchestra - Lorenzo Turchi-Floris, conductor | Chœur and Orchestre Symphonique du Mont-Blanc - SMB Studio Production (FR - 2002)
- Mozart, Fauré, Strauss in "OSMB" for piano, violoncello and orchestra - Lorenzo Turchi-Floris, conductor | Chœur and Orchestre Symphonique du Mont-Blanc - SMB Studio Production (FR - 2000)
- Bach, Beethoven, Berg, Liszt in "Récital de Piano" - Lorenzo Turchi-Floris, piano - SMB Studio Production (FR - 2000 - Live recording)
- Chopin, LIszt, Beethoven, Rachmaninoff in "Piano Competition" - Lorenzo Turchi-Floris, piano - Castel S. Angelo Production (IT - 1994 - Live recording)
