= Treaty of London (1915) =

World War I treaty between Italy and the Triple Entente

Agreement between France, Russia, Great Britain and Italy. Signed at London April 26, 1915.
- Type: Multilateral treaty
- Context: Entry of Italy into World War I
- Signed: 26 April 1915
- Location: London, United Kingdom
- Negotiators: (United Kingdom of Great Britain and Ireland) H. H. Asquith; (United Kingdom of Great Britain and Ireland) Edward Grey; (France) Théophile Delcassé; (Russian Empire) Sergey Sazonov; (Kingdom of Italy) Antonio Salandra; (Kingdom of Italy) Sidney Sonnino
- Signatories: (United Kingdom of Great Britain and Ireland) Edward Grey; (France) Paul Cambon; (Russian Empire) Alexander von Benckendorff; (Kingdom of Italy) Guglielmo Imperiali
- Parties: United Kingdom; France; Russia; Italy
- Languages: French and English

Full text
- Treaty of London (1915) at Wikisource

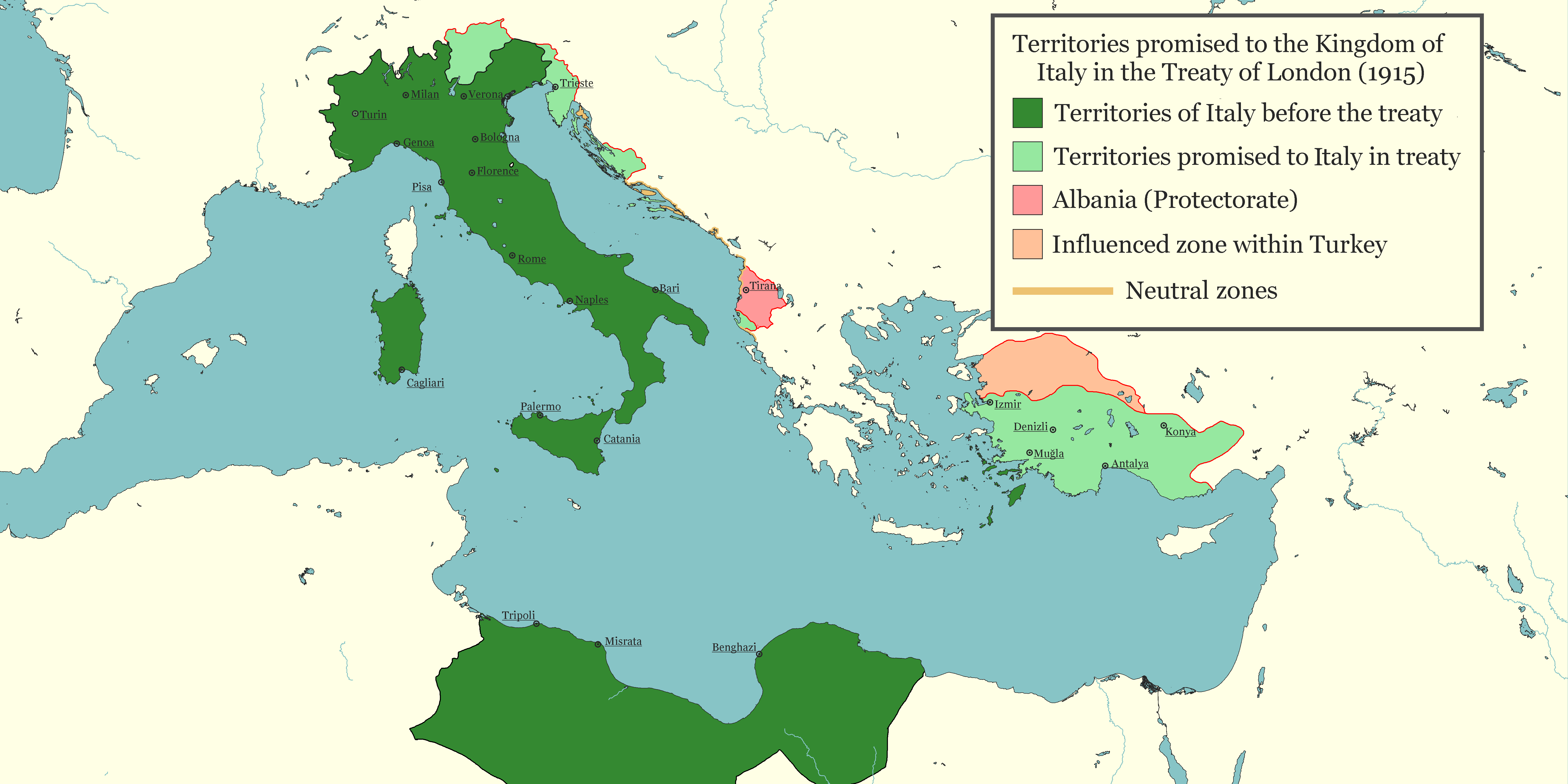
Territories promised to Italy in the treaty of London (1915)

The Treaty of London (Italian: Trattato di Londra; Russian: Лондонский договор, romanized: Londonskiy dogovor) or the Pact of London (Patto di Londra, French: Pacte de Londres) was a secret agreement concluded on 26 April 1915 by the United Kingdom, France, and Russia on the one part, and Italy on the other, in order to entice the latter to enter the Great War on the side of the Triple Entente. The agreement involved promises of Italian territorial expansion against Austria-Hungary, the Ottoman Empire and in Africa where it was promised enlargement of its colonies. The Entente countries hoped to force the Central Powers – particularly Germany and Austria-Hungary – to divert some of their forces away from existing battlefields. The Entente also hoped that Romania and Bulgaria would be encouraged to join them after Italy did the same.

In May 1915, Italy declared war on Austria-Hungary but waited a year before declaring war on Germany, leading France and the UK to resent the delay. At the Paris Peace Conference after the war, the United States of America applied pressure to void the treaty as contrary to the principle of self-determination. A new agreement produced at the conference reduced the territorial gains promised by the treaty: Italy received Trentino-Alto Adige/Südtirol and the Julian March in addition to the occupation of the city of Vlorë, Albania and the Dodecanese Islands. Italy was compelled to settle its eastern border with the new Kingdom of Serbs, Croats, and Slovenes through the bilateral Treaty of Rapallo. Italy thus received Istria and the city of Zadar as an enclave in Dalmatia, along with several islands along the eastern Adriatic Sea shore. The Entente went back on its promises to provide Italy with expanded colonies and a part of Asia Minor.

The results of the Paris Peace Conference transformed wartime national fervour in Italy into nationalistic resentment championed by Gabriele D'Annunzio by declaring that the outcome of Italy's war was a mutilated victory. He led a successful march of veterans and disgruntled soldiers to capture the port of Rijeka, which was claimed by Italy and denied by the Entente powers. The move became known as the Impresa di Fiume, and D'Annunzio proclaimed the short-lived Italian Regency of Carnaro in the city before being forced out by the Italian military so that the Free State of Fiume could be established instead. The Regency of Carnaro was significant in the development of Italian fascism.

== Background ==
Soon after the outbreak of World War I, the Triple Entente powers – the United Kingdom, France, and Russia – sought to attract more allies to their side. The first attempt to bring in Italy (a part of the Triple Alliance) as an ally of the Entente was in August–September 1914. The matter became closely related to contemporary efforts to obtain an alliance with Bulgaria, or at least secure its neutrality, in return for territorial gains against Entente-allied Serbia. As compensation, Serbia was promised territories which were parts of Austria-Hungary at the time, specifically Bosnia and Herzegovina and an outlet to the Adriatic Sea in Dalmatia.

== Negotiations ==
=== First offers ===
Rival military coalitions in 1914: Triple Entente Triple Alliance

The August–September 1914 negotiations between the Entente and Italy were conducted on Russian initiative. On 4 August, only a day after Italy declared neutrality, its ambassador to Russia said that Italy might join the Entente in return for Trentino-Alto Adige/Südtirol, Vlorë, and a dominant position in the Adriatic. Believing that such a move by Italy would prompt Romania to join the Entente as well against Austria-Hungary, Russian foreign minister Sergey Sazonov pursued the matter. British Foreign Minister Edward Grey supported the idea; he said that Trieste should be added to the claim as potentially important to win over Italian public opinion on joining the war.

The Italian ambassador to the United Kingdom, Guglielmo Imperiali, presented Grey with Italy's conditions, but Grey did not consider the talks could produce any practical results. He told Imperiali that Britain would not consider the matter any further until Italy committed itself to joining the Entente. On Grey's instructions, Rennell Rodd, British ambassador to Italy, asked Italian Prime Minister Antonio Salandra if Italy could enter the war. Salandra informed Rodd that this was impossible at the time and that any premature attempt to abandon neutrality would jeopardise any prospect of a future alliance. Sazonov was informed accordingly, and Russia abandoned the matter.

The motives for the Entente's overture to Italy and Italian consideration of entering the war were entirely opportunistic. The Entente saw Germany as the principal enemy and wanted to force it to divert some of its forces away from the existing battlefields. Italy had basically different interests from the Entente powers. It saw opportunities to fulfil Italian irredentist objectives in Austria-Hungary, to gain a dominant position in the Adriatic basin and to expand its colonial empire. Initially, the majority of the Italian public favoured neutrality, but groups favouring an expansionist war against Austria-Hungary formed in every part of the political spectrum. The most ardent supporters of war became irredentist groups such as Trento e Trieste (Trento and Trieste) led by Giovanni Giuriati or Alfredo Rocco who saw the war as an opportunity for ethnic struggle against neighbouring South Slavic populations.

=== Occupation of Vlorë ===
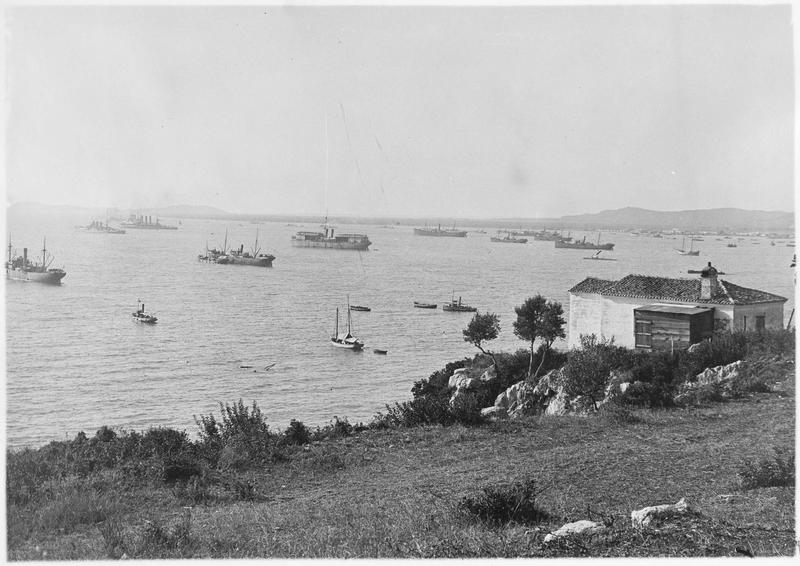
Italian Navy in Vlorë in 1915

Salandra and his foreign minister Antonino Paternò Castello did not break off the negotiations completely. They used the subsequent months to wait for a chance to increase Italian demands to the maximum at an opportune time. There was an attempt to relaunch the negotiations in London on 16 September when Castello told Rodd that the British and Italians shared interests in preventing westward spread of Slavic domains under Russian influence, specifically by preventing Slavic influence in the Adriatic, where irredentists claimed Dalmatia. While Castello instructed Imperiali to tell the British that Italy would not decide to abandon its neutrality before the Entente accepted their conditions, Grey insisted on Italy first committing to joining the Entente and the talks collapsed again.

Particular opposition to the Italian claim against Dalmatia came from the Permanent Under-Secretary of State for Foreign Affairs Arthur Nicolson who remarked that Sazonov was right to claim that Dalmatia wished to unite with Kingdom of Croatia-Slavonia. He added that if Dalmatia were annexed by Italy, it would inherit a problem from Austria-Hungary, that of having a large South Slavic population looking for greater independence.

Nonetheless, Castello managed to obtain British endorsement for Italian occupation of Vlorë. The move was made as a preparation for Italian intervention and designed to lend some prestige to the Italian government. Expecting opposition from Sazonov, Castello asked Grey to get the Russians to let him have this without making any concessions in return as a necessary evil to attract Italy to join the Entente.

=== Sonnino replaces Castello ===
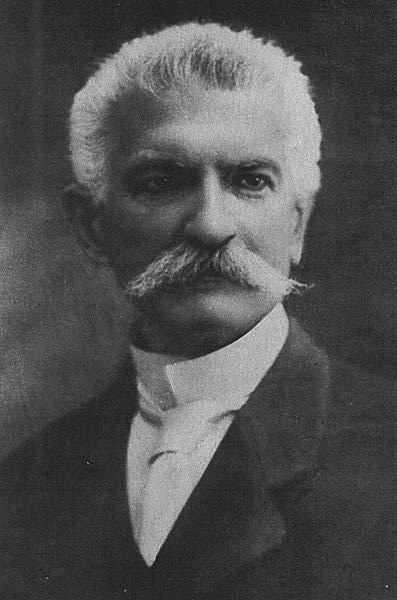
Sidney Sonnino became the Italian Foreign Minister in November 1914.

In late October, there was an attempt to get Italy to intervene against an expected Turkish attack against the Suez Canal. Sazonov warned Grey not to offer Dalmatia in exchange and the latter replied that no such offer was made as the canal remaining open was in Italian interests too.

The matter of an Italian alliance was taken up by Castello's successor Sidney Sonnino and Rodd in November. Sonnino proposed a non-binding agreement which could be turned into a binding one at an opportune time. Even though similar proposals by his predecessor were turned down, Rodd was informed through his contacts in the Italian government that the Italian Armed Forces were prepared to intervene by February 1915, prompting Rodd to urge Grey to consider the proposal. However, Grey declined the idea as a hypothetical bargain as he appeared indifferent to an Italian alliance at this point.

Following this, Salandra and Sonnino conducted negotiations with the Central Powers in an apparent attempt to keep the Central Powers at bay until further negotiations were possible with the Entente. These talks collapsed on 15 February 1915. The following day, Sonnino sent Imperiali a specific list of conditions set out in sixteen points necessary for Italy to enter the war.

=== Seeking Bulgarian alliance ===
While the Entente Powers were negotiating with Italy, they led a concurrent diplomatic effort aimed at obtaining Bulgarian alliance (or at least friendly neutrality). This situation led to a conflict of territorial claims staked by Italy and Serbia. Namely, awarding Italy Dalmatia would largely block the Adriatic outlet offered to Serbia (in addition to Bosnia and Herzegovina) as compensation to Serbia's cession of much of Vardar Macedonia to Bulgaria requested by the Entente as enticement to Bulgaria. Sazonov wanted to strengthen his offer to Serbia and indirectly to Bulgaria by guaranteeing such an outlet to Serbia, but Grey blocked the initiative, arguing that an Italian alliance was more important.

In mid-February, following the start of the Gallipoli campaign, the British were convinced that Bulgaria would enter the war on the side of the Entente within weeks, certain of its victory. Even though it worked to bring Bulgaria on board, Russia was anxious that Bulgarian and Greek forces might occupy Constantinople to push Russia out of the region despite being promised control of the city by the Entente. Sonnino saw the combined Bulgarian and Greek entry into the war likely to assure Entente victory in the Balkans. On 4 March, Imperiali informed Grey that Italy would enter the war and presented him with the 16 conditions insisting on curtailing Slavic westward advance.

=== Russian claim over Constantinople ===
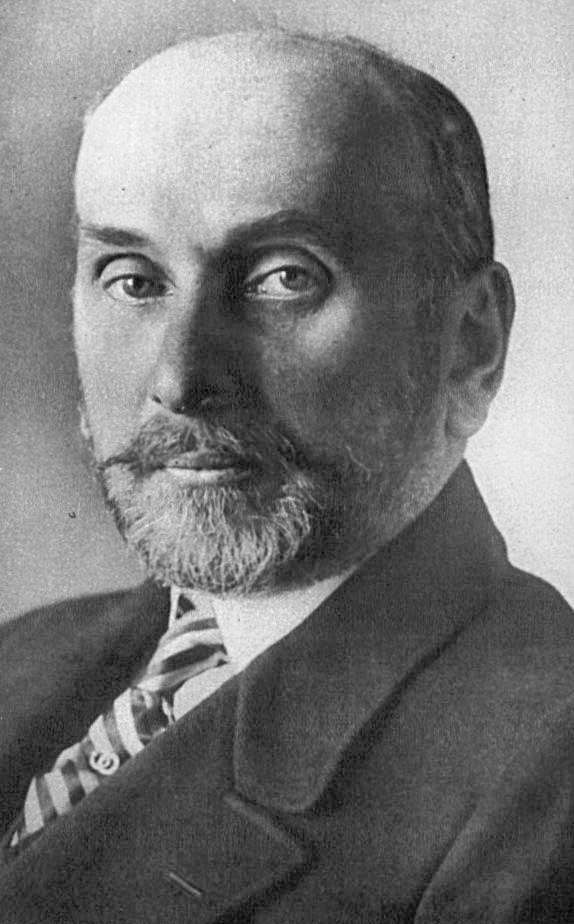
Russian interests were represented by Foreign Minister Sergey Sazonov.

Grey noted that the Italian claims were excessive, but also that they did not conflict with British interests. He also thought that recent Russian stubborn objections against Greek attack to capture Constantinople could be overcome by addition of Italian troops, and that Italian participation in the war would expedite a decision from Bulgaria and Romania, still waiting to commit to the war.

Sazonov objected to any Italian role regarding Constantinople, seeing it as a threat to Russian control of the city promised by the allies in return for Russian losses in the war. This led Grey to obtain formal recognition of the Russian claim to the city by the Committee of Imperial Defence and by France, leading Sazonov to acquiesce to an agreement with Italy, except he would not consent to Italy taking the Adriatic coast south of the city of Split and as long as the Italian troops did not participate in the capture of the Turkish Straits.

The request concerning the Turkish Straits was found acceptable by Grey since the British never anticipated Italy would take part in the campaign against Constantinople. The bulk of the Italian claim, concerning acquisition of Trentino, Trieste, and Istria was likely to attract protests against handing predominantly Slav-populated territories to Italy from Frano Supilo – a dominant figure in the nascent Yugoslav Committee advocating interests of South Slavs living in Austria-Hungary. On the other hand, the Serbian Prime Minister Nikola Pašić and Sazonov found it acceptable. Even though Serbian Niš Declaration of war objectives called for the struggle to liberate and unify "unliberated brothers", referring to "three tribes of one people" meaning the Serbs, the Croats, and the Slovenes, as means to attract support from South Slavs living in Austria-Hungary, Pašić was primarily concerned with achieving a Greater Serbia. Sazonov acquiesced, adding that he has nothing to say on behalf of the Croats and the Slovenes and would not approve Russian forces to fight "half a day" for liberty of the Slovenes.

=== Final six weeks of talks ===
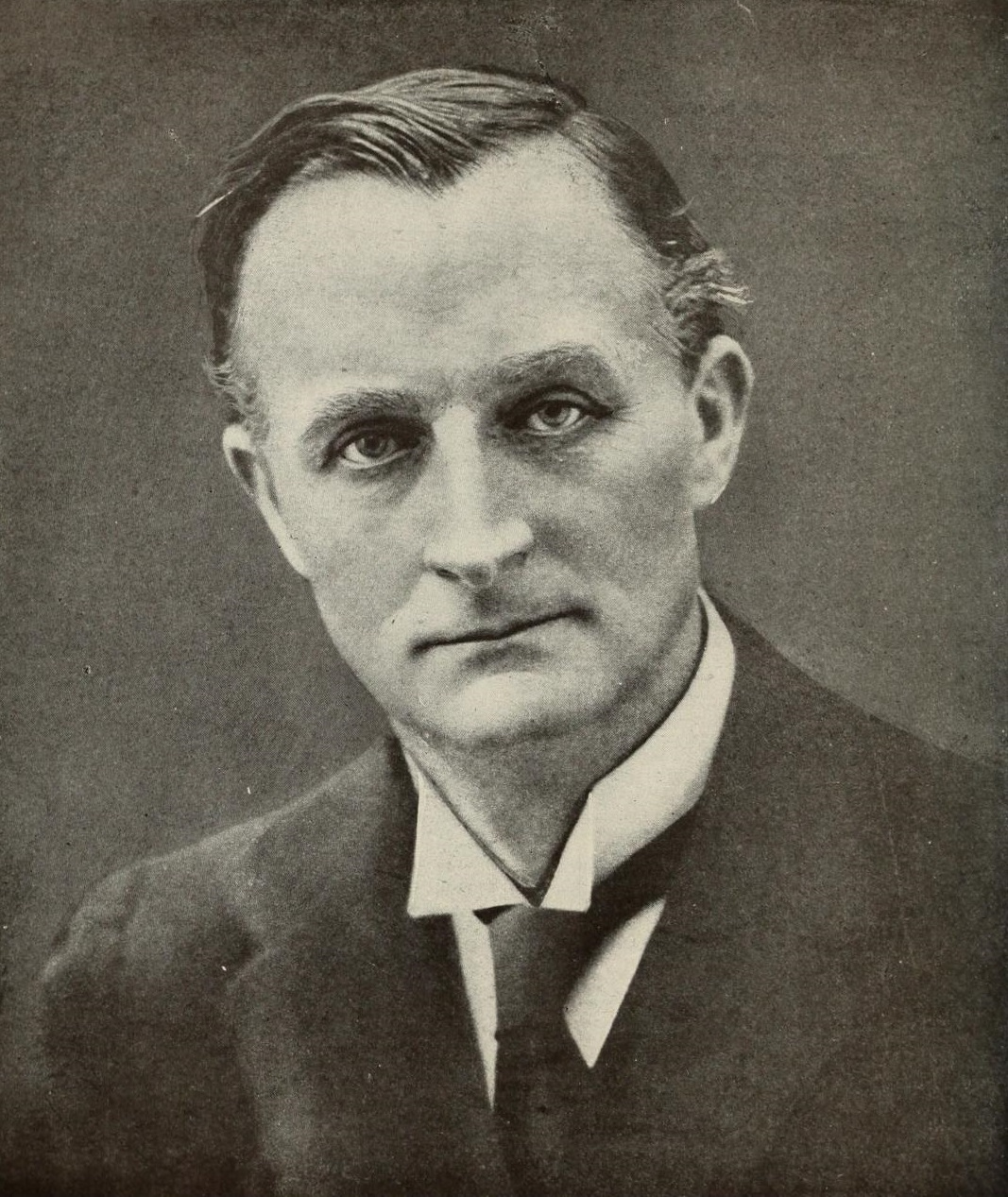
Foreign Secretary Edward Grey was the principal British negotiator.

Nonetheless, negotiations extended for six weeks over disagreements as the extent of Italian territorial gains in Dalmatia was still objected to by Sazonov. The Italian claim of Dalmatia to the Neretva River, including the Pelješac Peninsula and all Adriatic islands was not based on self-determination, but on security concerns in a future war, as the Italian negotiators alleged that Russia might occupy the Austrian-controlled coast while Italy had no defensible port on the western shore of the Adriatic. The Committee of Imperial Defence was concerned about rising Russian naval power in the Mediterranean and it is possible, although there is no direct evidence, that this influenced the British support for the Italian claims in the Adriatic, as means to deny it to Russia.

Hoping to achieve the diplomatic breakthrough in securing alliances with Bulgaria, Romania, and Greece, Grey turned Sonnino's 16 points into a draft agreement and forwarded it to Russia against protests by the Yugoslav Committee. Sazonov objected to the draft agreement and dismissed an Italian offer of Dubrovnik as a port for South Slavs as it lacked inland transport routes. Sazonov demanded Split in addition as a better port and objected to the requested demilitarisation of the coast belonging to the Kingdom of Montenegro. Grey drew up a document taking into consideration the Russian objections and forwarded it to Imperiali, but Sonnino threatened to end the negotiations over the differences.

The deadlock was broken by French Foreign Minister Théophile Delcassé who was ready to pay any price to obtain an alliance with Italy believing it would bring about alliances with Bulgaria, Greece, and Romania as well. Delcassé proposed a reduction in the Italian claim in Dalmatia to favour Serbia in exchange for unrestricted possession of the Dodecanese Islands. The initiative succeeded because the Russian Imperial Army lost initiative in the Carpathians and its commander in chief, Grand Duke Nicholas, informed Sazonov that Italian and Romanian support would be needed urgently to regain the initiative. In response, Sazonov accepted the proposal put forward by Delcassé, insisting that Italy enter the war by the end of April and leaving all treaty-related demilitarisation matters to the British Prime Minister H. H. Asquith to decide. Asquith produced a draft agreement on 9 April and it was accepted by Sonnino with minor amendments five days later. The agreement was signed on 26 April by Grey and ambassadors Paul Cambon, Imperiali, and Alexander von Benckendorff, on behalf of the United Kingdom, France, Italy, and Russia.

== Terms ==
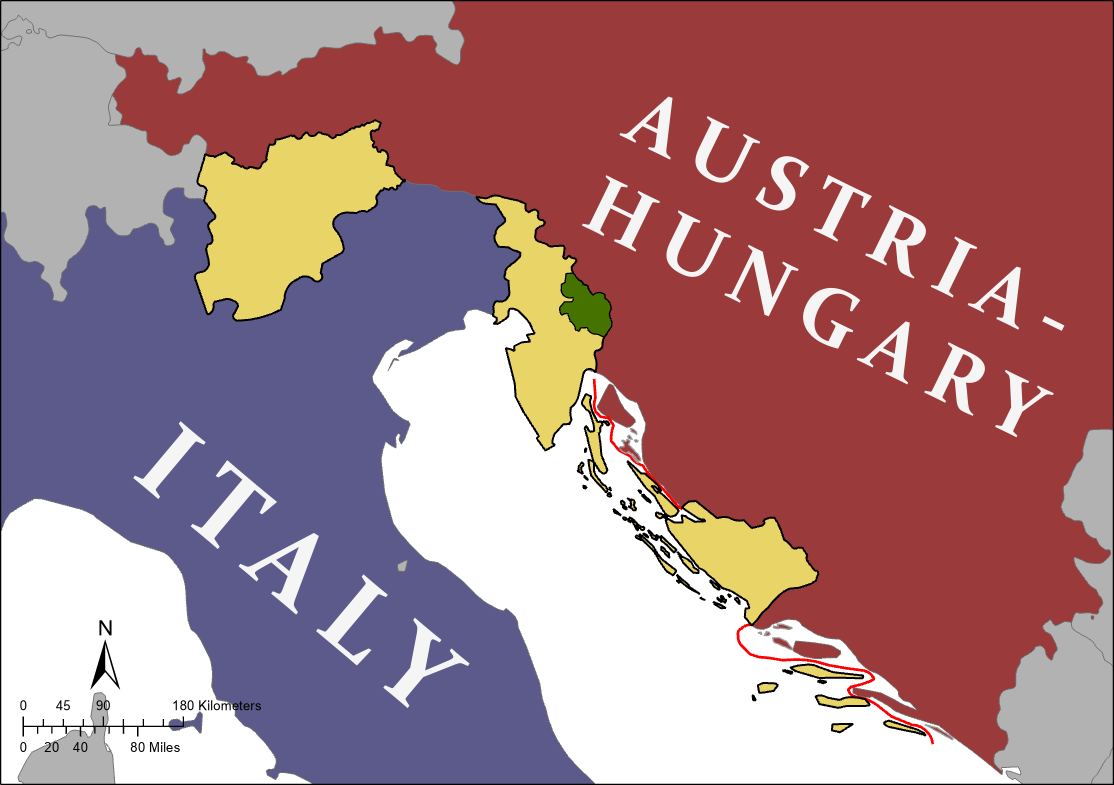
Territories promised to Italy by the Entente in the South Tyrol, the Austrian Littoral, and Dalmatia (tan), and the Snežnik Plateau area (green). Dalmatia, after WWI, however, was not assigned to Italy but to Yugoslavia

Article 1 of the treaty determined that a military agreement shall be concluded to guarantee the number of troops committed by Russia against Austria-Hungary to prevent it from concentrating all its forces against Italy. Article 2 required Italy to enter the war against all enemies of the United Kingdom, Russia, and France, and Article 3 obliged the French and British navies from supporting the Italian war effort by destroying the Austro-Hungarian fleet.

Article 4 of the treaty determined that Italy shall receive Trentino and the southern part of Tyrol (later referred to as South Tyrol) by defining a new Italian–Austrian frontier line between the Piz Umbrail and Toblach, and a new eastern Italian frontier running from Tarvisio in the north to the coast in the Kvarner Gulf leaving Rijeka just outside the Italian territory.

Article 5 awarded Dalmatia to Italy – specifically the part north of a line running northeast from Cape Planka – including cities of Zadar and Šibenik, as well as the basin of the Krka River and its tributaries in the Italian territory. The article also awarded Italy all Austro-Hungarian Adriatic islands except Brač, Šolta, Čiovo, Drvenik Mali, Drvenik Veli, Krk, Rab, Prvić, Sveti Grgur, Goli Otok, Jakljan, and Koločep. The article specified that the remaining coast between Rijeka and the Drin River is awarded to Croatia, Serbia, and Montenegro.

Furthermore, Article 5 required demilitarisation of the coast between the Cape Planka and the Aoös River with exception of the strip between Pelješac and a point 10 kilometres (6.2 mi) southeast of Dubrovnik and in Montenegrin territory where military bases were allowed through prewar arrangements. The demilitarisation was meant to assure Italy of military dominance in the region. The coast between the point 10 km (6.2 mi) southeast of Dubrovnik and the Drin River was to be divided between Serbia and Montenegro. Articles 4 and 5 thus added to Italy's population 200,000 speakers of German, and 600,000 South Slavs.

Articles 6 and 7 gave Italy full sovereignty over Vlorë, the Sazan Island, and surrounding territory necessary for defence, requiring it to leave a strip of land west of the Lake Ohrid to allow a border between Serbia and Greece. Italy was to represent Albania in foreign relations, but it was also required to acquiesce to its partition between Serbia, Montenegro, and Greece if the United Kingdom, France, and Russia decided so. Article 8 gave Italy full sovereignty over the Dodecanese Islands.

Provisions detailing territorial gains beyond Europe were comparably vaguely written. Article 9 promised Italy territory in the area of Antalya in a potential Partition of the Ottoman Empire, while Article 10 gave it rights belonging to the Sultan in Libya under the Treaty of Ouchy. Article 13 promised Italy compensation if the French or British colonial empires made territorial gains against the German colonial empire in Africa. In Article 12, Italy upheld the Entente powers in support of future control of Mecca and Medina by an independent Muslim state.

Articles 11 and 14 promised a share in any war indemnity and a loan to Italy in the amount of 50 million pounds sterling respectively. Article 15 promised Entente support to Italian opposition to inclusion of the Holy See in any settlement of questions raised by the war, and Article 16 stipulated that the treaty was to be kept secret.

== Aftermath ==
=== Response ===
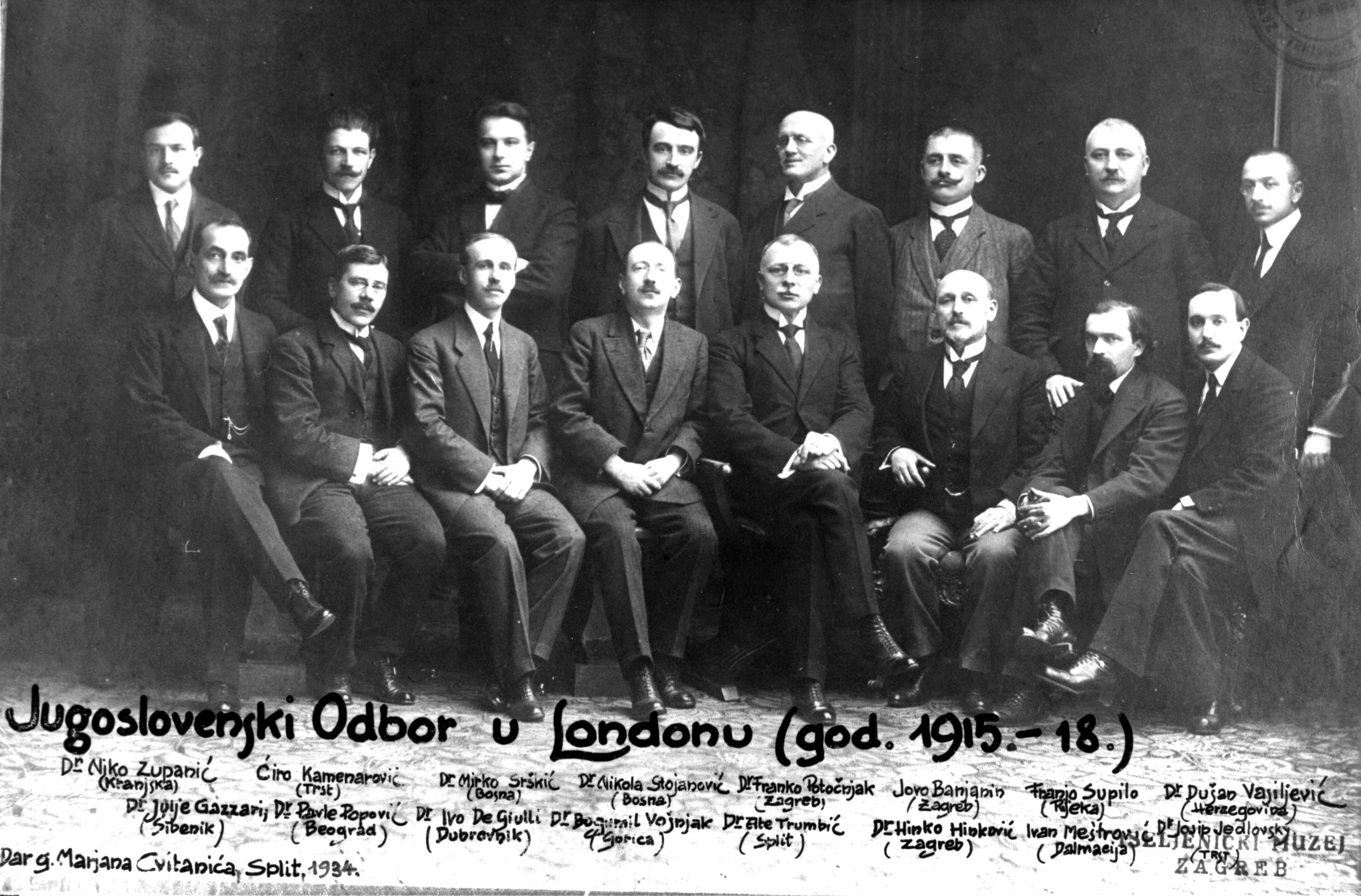
The Yugoslav Committee was representing interests of the South Slavs living in Austria-Hungary.

Even though the treaty was meant to be secret, an outline of its provisions became known to the Yugoslav Committee and its supporters in London in late April 1915. Serbia and the Yugoslav Committee protested it in strong terms in Entente capitals. Pašić condemned the disregard for the self-determination principle on which the Niš Declaration rested and the lack of consultations with Serbia. He demanded the Entente refrain from treaties with Hungary or Romania on borders of interest to Croatia without conferring with Serbia first, as well as requesting assurances of future political union of the Serbs, Croats, and Slovenes. Pašić telegraphed his proposal to Grey from the provisional wartime capital of Niš through British ambassador Charles Louis des Graz. However, Grey declined both requests. The Yugoslav Committee president Ante Trumbić met with Lord Crewe, a senior member of the British Cabinet, demanding support for unification of Croatia, Istria, and Dalmatia and then for a political union with Serbia. News of the treaty also compelled the Yugoslav Committee to adopt a less critical view of Serbian demands concerning the method of political unification of the South Slavs as it became clear that the unity of the Croats and the unity of the Slovenes would depend on success of Serbia. Full text of the treaty text was published by the Bolsheviks after the October Revolution. In 1917, Pašić and Trumbić negotiated and agreed upon the Corfu Declaration setting out a plan for post-war unification of South Slavs to counter the Italian territorial claims outlined in the Treaty of London.

Grey's policy and the treaty were criticised in British press. An early example of such critique was "The National Union of South Slavs and the Adriatic Question" written by Arthur Evans and published in April 1915. Evans described the treaty as a manifestation of Italian chauvinistic ambitions against Dalmatia causing a crisis. Evans expanded on his criticism in the article "Italy and Dalmatia" published by The Times on 27 April. Evans was joined by historians Robert Seton-Watson and Wickham Steed by describing the Italian claims as absurd and Grey's policies as unjust. Grey responded by reiterating that in the event of victory in the war, Serbia would receive territories from Austria-Hungary allowing its enlargement.

=== Further course of the war ===
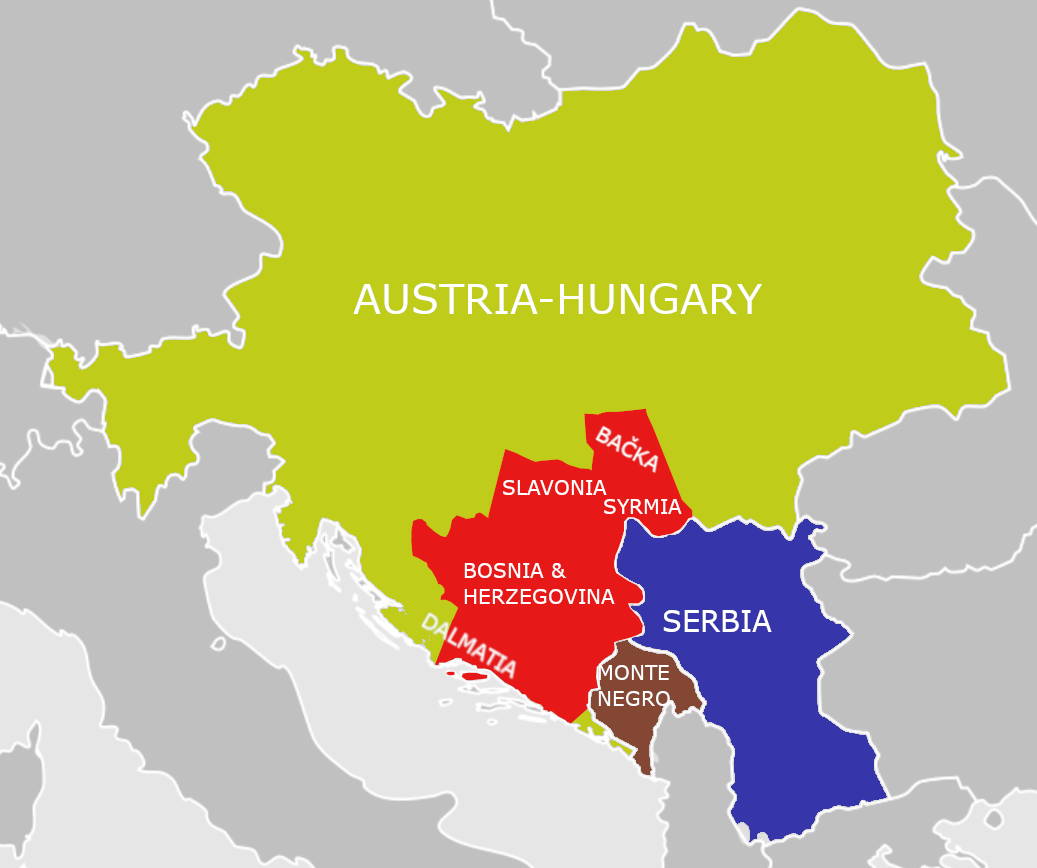
Approximate extent of territorial promises (red) to Serbia at the expense of Austria-Hungary made around the time of conclusion of the Treaty of London.

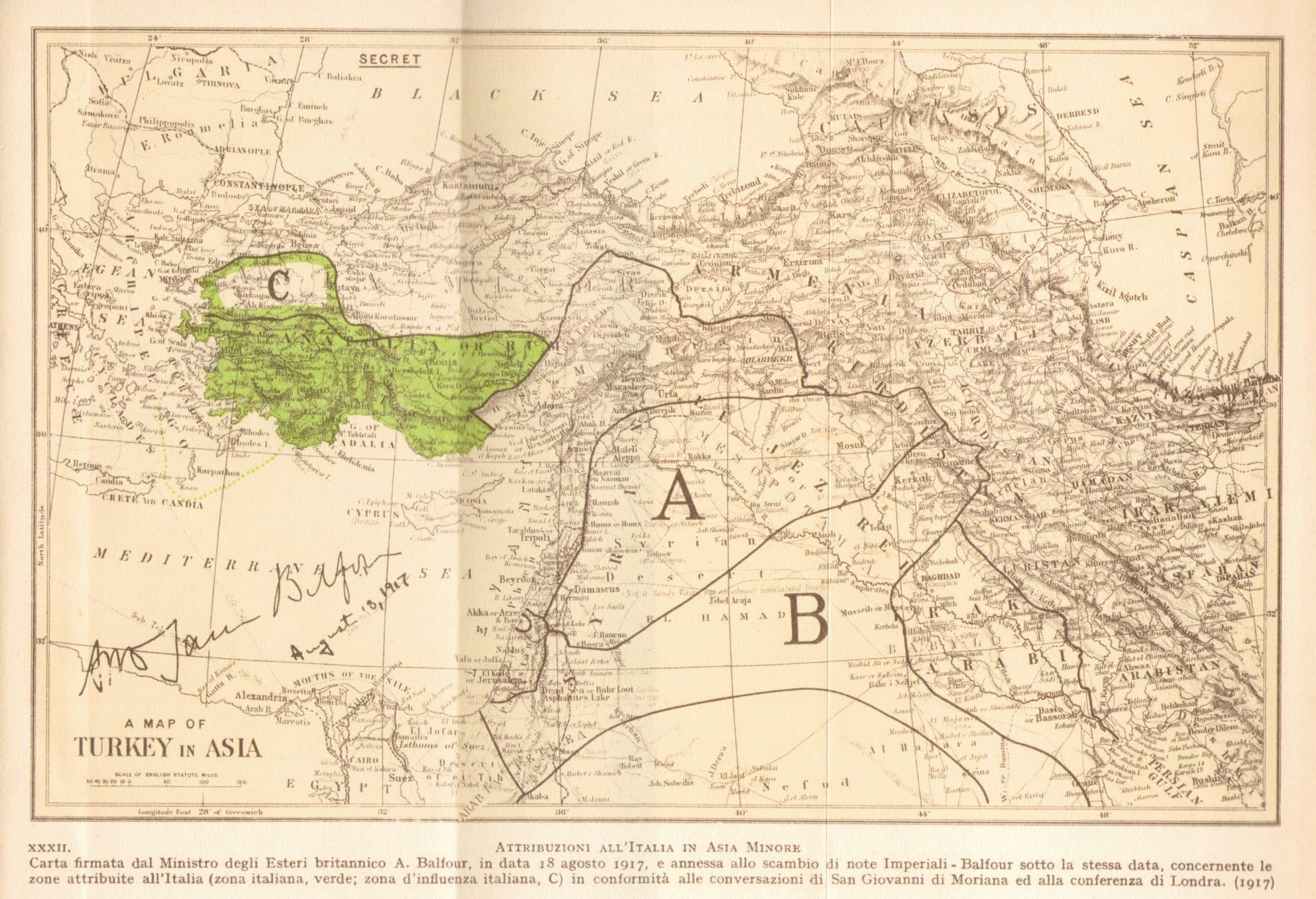
Italian zone in Asia Minor under the Agreement of Saint-Jean-de-Maurienne

In the final weeks before entering the war, internal struggle took place in Italy. National fervour was whipped up by speeches of Gabriele D'Annunzio, who called for war as a measure of national worth and inciting violence against neutralists and the former Prime Minister Giovanni Giolitti who favoured neutrality. This period became known as the radiant days.

On 22 May 1915, the Italian government decided to launch the Alpine Front by declaring war against Austria-Hungary alone. This ignored the requirement set out in Article 2 to wage war against all the Central Powers. France accused Italy of violating the Treaty of London, and Russia speculated on the potential existence of a non-aggression agreement between Italy and Germany. Lack of preparation of the army was cited as the decision for the non-compliance with the treaty. Failure to declare war on other Central Powers, especially Germany, led to isolation of Italy among the Entente powers. Following pressure from the Entente and internal political struggle, war was declared on the Ottoman Empire on 20 August. Italy did not declare war on Germany until 27 August 1916. Italy was nearly militarily defeated by the Central Powers in 1917, at the Battle of Caporetto. Following a major retreat, the Italian forces managed to recover and mount a comeback a year later in the Battle of Vittorio Veneto at the cost of 600,000 dead, social unrest in the country and a badly damaged economy. Under the provisions of the Armistice of Villa Giusti, Italy was allowed to occupy Austro-Hungarian territory promised to her under the Treaty of London – parts of which were also claimed by the diplomatically unrecognised State of Slovenes, Croats and Serbs. Italian troops began to move into those areas on 3 November 1918, entered Rijeka on 17 November and were stopped before Ljubljana by city-organised defence including a battalion of Serbian prisoners of war.

The entry of Italy into the war did not entice Bulgaria to join the Entente as it became more cautious regarding further developments after early British and French setbacks at Gallipoli. Following the German capture of Kaunas in Lithuania in late June during the Russian retreat, Bulgaria became convinced the Entente would lose the war. In August, the Entente powers sent a note to Pašić, promising territorial gains in exchange for territorial concessions in Vardar Macedonia to Bulgaria. The note promised Bosnia and Herzegovina, Syrmia, Bačka, the Adriatic Coast from Cape Planka to the point 10 km (6.2 mi) southeast from Dubrovnik, Dalmatian islands not assigned to Italy, and Slavonia if it was captured by the Entente militarily. On Sonnino's request, Pašić was not offered Central Croatia. Pašić agreed, offering to cede to Bulgaria a part of Vardar Macedonia largely along the lines agreed in 1912 at the end of the First Balkan War but asked for further territorial gains by the addition of Central Croatia and Banat. The Slovene Lands not promised to Italy appeared to be meant to remain in Austria-Hungary. On 6 October, Bulgaria joined the Central Powers and attacked Serbia five days later.

=== Agreement of Saint-Jean-de-Maurienne ===
Partition of the Ottoman Empire was discussed by the Entente powers at two conferences in London in January and February 1917, and in Saint-Jean-de-Maurienne in April 1917. While it was apparent that the Italian interests were clashing with the British and the French, Italian representatives insisted on fulfilment of the promise given under the 1915 Treaty of London in the region of Antalya. To reinforce proportionality of Italian gains to those of their allies, the Italians added Konya and Adana vilayets to the claim. Most of the Italian demands were accepted in the Agreement of Saint-Jean-de-Maurienne. The French required that the Russia confirm the agreement though, which proved impossible following the Russian Revolution.

=== Paris Peace Conference ===
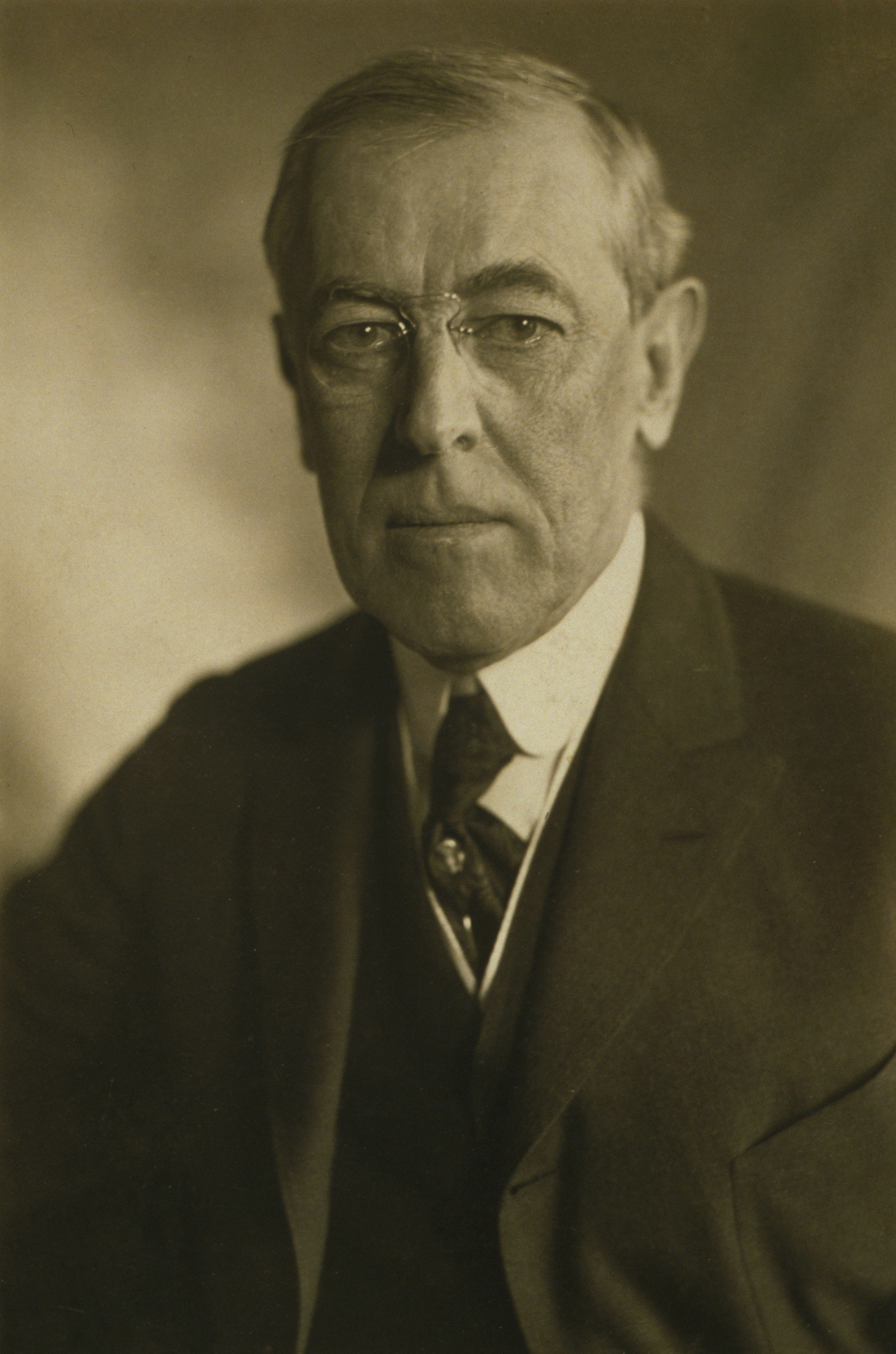
United States President Woodrow Wilson objected to the Treaty of London at the Paris Peace Conference.

Provisions of the Treaty of London were a major point of dispute between Italy and the remaining Entente powers at the Paris Peace Conference. The chief Italian representatives, Prime Minister Vittorio Emanuele Orlando and Sonnino demanded enforcement of the Treaty of London relying on application of the security principle, and annexation of Rijeka on the basis of self-determination (though disregarding its mainly Slavic suburb of Sušak). The British and the French would not publicly endorse any claims exceeding those afforded by the treaty while privately holding Italy deserved little because of its reserved attitude towards Germany in early stages of the war.

The French and the British let the President of the United States, Woodrow Wilson, hold Italian ambitions in check in the Adriatic by advocating self-determination of the area in accordance with point nine of his Fourteen Points. Wilson deemed the Treaty of London a symbol of perfidy of European diplomacy. He held the treaty invalid by application of the legal doctrine of clausula rebus sic stantibus on account of fundamental changes of circumstances following the breakup of Austria-Hungary. While the British and the French representatives remained passive on the issue, Wilson published a manifesto explaining his principles and appealing for sense of justice among Italians on 24 April 1919. Orlando and Sonnino left Paris in protest and were celebrated in Italy as champions of national honour. Even after their return on 7 May, they refused to take any initiative expecting a conciliatory offer from the Allies. In absence of the Italian delegation, the French and the British decided to annul the Agreement of Saint-Jean-de-Maurienne for lack of Russian consent and not to honour any Italian claims in Asia Minor or Africa.

Orlando and Sonnino held different positions regarding the eastern Adriatic shore claims. Orlando was prepared to give up on Dalmatia except Zadar and Šibenik while insisting on annexing Rijeka. Sonnino held the opposite view. This led to adoption of a widely publicised slogan of "Pact of London plus Fiume" and demanding the London Treaty promises and Rijeka becoming the matter of Italian national honour. Ultimately, Italian gains on the eastern Adriatic shore were limited to the Julian March, Istria, and several islands. Rijeka was assigned the status of an independent city, following negotiations between Orlando and Trumbić. Italian gains included corrections of the Treaty of London borders around Tarvisio to give Italy a direct rail link with Austria. In Dalmatia, the British Prime Minister David Lloyd George only supported a free-city status for Zadar and Šibenik, while French Prime Minister Georges Clemenceau only supported such a status for Zadar. In the secret Venizelos–Tittoni agreement, Italy renounced its claims over the Dodecanese Islands except for Rhodes in favour of Greece while the two countries agreed to support each other's claims in partition of Albania.

=== Mutilated victory ===
Orlando's and Sonnino's inability to secure all the territory promised by the Treaty of London or the city of Rijeka produced a sense that Italy was losing the peace. Patriotic fervour gave way to nationalistic grievance and the government was seen as incapable of defending national interests. Orlando's successor as Prime Minister, Francesco Saverio Nitti, decided to pull out occupying Italian troops from Rijeka and hand the city over to the inter-Allied military command. That prompted D'Annunzio to lead a force consisting of veterans and rebelling soldiers (with the support of regular troops deployed in the border area) in what became known as the Impresa di Fiume to the successful capture of Rijeka. D'Annunzio declared the Italian Regency of Carnaro in the city; its system of government influenced the development of Fascism. It became a model for an alternative parliamentary order sought by the Fascists.

The Impresa di Fiume brought about the fall of the Nitti government under pressure from the Italian Socialist Party, D'Annunzio, and Benito Mussolini. Nitti's successor Giolitti and "democratic renouncers" of Dalmatian heritage were next criticised by the nationalists. D'Annunzio formulated the charge in the slogan "Victory of ours, you shall not be mutilated", referencing the promise of Dalmatia given in the Treaty of London, failure to annex the "utterly Italian" city of Rijeka, and elusive Adriatic domination as rendering Italian participation in the war meaningless. His position thus gave rise to the myth of the mutilated victory.

Following the Mutiny of the Bersaglieri, in what is termed the 1920 Vlora War, Albanian forces forced out the Italian garrison deployed to Vlorë; the latter retained Sazan Island. On 22 July, Italy renounced the Venizelos–Tittoni agreement and guaranteed Albanian independence within its 1913 borders instead. Italy directly contacted the newly established Kingdom of Serbs, Croats and Slovenes for a compromise on their borders on the eastern Adriatic shores. The border was settled by the Treaty of Rapallo, conceding a little of the hoped for northern gains (within today's largely Slovene Littoral (also called Austrian Littoral, coast or Julian March)) but gaining Istria and the city-enclave of Zadar and several islands. Giolitti had the Italian Navy drive D'Annunzio from Rijeka, and the city became the Free State of Fiume under provisions of the Treaty of Rapallo. It comprised settlement of the border awarding Italy territory on the Snežnik Plateau north of Rijeka and a strip of land between the city and Italian-controlled Istria. The Treaty of Rapallo nonetheless added 350,000 Slovenes and Croats to the population of Italy.

== See also ==
- Treaties of Rome – 1941 treaties agreed with states under the effective control of Nazi Germany awarding Italy the unfulfilled parts of Dalmatia and small parts of adjacent shores.

== Sources ==
- Agreement between France, Russia, Great Britain and Italy, signed at London, April 26, 1915 . London: H.M. Stationery Office. 1920. OCLC 807191361 – via Wikisource.
- Banac, Ivo (1984). The National Question in Yugoslavia: Origins, History, Politics. Ithaca: Cornell University Press. ISBN 0-8014-1675-2.
- Burgwyn, H. James (1997). Italian Foreign Policy in the Interwar Period 1918–1940. Westport: Praeger Publishers. ISBN 9780275948771.
- Glenny, Misha (2012). The Balkans, 1804–2012: Nationalism, War and the Great Powers. Toronto: House of Anansi Press. ISBN 978-1-77089-273-6.
- Hall, Richard C. (2014). Consumed by War: European Conflict in the 20th Century. Lexington: University Press of Kentucky. ISBN 9780813159959.
- Hill, Chesney (1934). The Doctrine of "rebus sic stantibus" in International Law. Vol. IX. Columbia: University of Missouri. OCLC 1876470.
- Knox, MacGregor (2007). To the Threshold of Power, 1922/33: Origins and Dynamics of the Fascist and Nationalist Socialist Dictatorships. Vol. I. Cambridge: Cambridge University Press. ISBN 978-0-521-87860-9.
- Lampe, John R. (2000). Yugoslavia as History: Twice There Was a Country (2nd ed.). Cambridge: Cambridge University Press. ISBN 0-521-77357-1.
- Lowe, C. J. (1969). "Britain and Italian Intervention, 1914–1915". The Historical Journal. XII (3). Cambridge: Cambridge University Press: 533–548. doi:10.1017/S0018246X00007275. ISSN 0018-246X. JSTOR 2638003. S2CID 162738142.
- Merlicco, Giordano (2021). "Between old Austria and new foes: Italy and the Yugoslav project (1917-1918)" (PDF). Istorijski Zapisi. XCIV (1–2). Podgorica: Istorijski institut Crne Gore: 115–138. ISSN 0021-2652. Archived (PDF) from the original on 1 June 2023.
- Mitrović, Andrej (2003). "The Yugoslav Question, the First World War and the Peace Conference, 1914–1920". In Djokic, Dejan (ed.). Yugoslavism: Histories of a Failed Idea, 1918–1992. London: C. Hurst & Co. pp. 42–56. ISBN 1-85065-663-0.
- Moos, Carlo (2017), "Südtirol im St. Germain-Kontext", in Georg Grote and Hannes Obermair (ed.), A Land on the Threshold. South Tyrolean Transformations, 1915–2015, Oxford-Berne-New York: Peter Lang, pp. 27–39, ISBN 978-3-0343-2240-9
- Morgan, Philip (2004). Italian Fascism, 1915–1945. New York: Palgrave Macmillan. ISBN 978-1-4039-3251-8.
- Pavlović, Vojislav G. (2019). "Italy and the Creation of Yugoslavia. Delenda Austria?". In Pavlović, Vojislav G. (ed.). Serbia and Italy in the Great War. Belgrade: Institute for Balkan Studies. pp. 245–278. ISBN 9788671791038.
- Pavlowitch, Kosta St. (2003). "The First World War and Unification of Yugoslavia". In Djokic, Dejan (ed.). Yugoslavism: Histories of a Failed Idea, 1918–1992. London: C. Hurst & Co. pp. 27–41. ISBN 1-85065-663-0.
- Ramet, Sabrina P. (2006). The Three Yugoslavias: State-building and Legitimation, 1918–2005. Bloomington: Indiana University Press. ISBN 9780253346568. Archived from the original on 28 September 2024.
- Riccardi, Luca (2019). "Italy and the Entente in the First World War: The Policy of Sidney Sonnino". In Pavlović, Vojislav G. (ed.). Serbia and Italy in the Great War. Belgrade: Institute for Balkan Studies. pp. 43–80. ISBN 9788671791038.
- Robbins, Keith (1971). "British Diplomacy and Bulgaria 1914–1915". The Slavonic and East European Review. 49 (117). London: Modern Humanities Research Association: 560–585. ISSN 0037-6795. JSTOR 4206453.
- Seton-Watson, Robert (1926). "Italian Intervention and the Secret Treaty of London". The Slavonic Review. V (14). London: Modern Humanities Research Association: 271–297. JSTOR 4202074.
- Trubetskoi, Grigorii N. (2016). Notes of a Plenipotentiary: Russian Diplomacy and War in the Balkans, 1914–1917. Ithaca: Cornell University Press. ISBN 9781501757327.
- Velikonja, Mitja (2003). "Slovenia's Yugoslav Century". In Djokic, Dejan (ed.). Yugoslavism: Histories of a Failed Idea, 1918–1992. London: C. Hurst & Co. pp. 84–99. ISBN 1-85065-663-0.
- Živojinović, Dragoljub (2019). "Serbia and the 1915 Treaty of London". In Pavlović, Vojislav G. (ed.). Serbia and Italy in the Great War. Belgrade: Institute for Balkan Studies. pp. 121–136. ISBN 9788671791038.
