= Victor Merzhanov =

Russian pianist (1919–2012)

- Виктор Мержанов
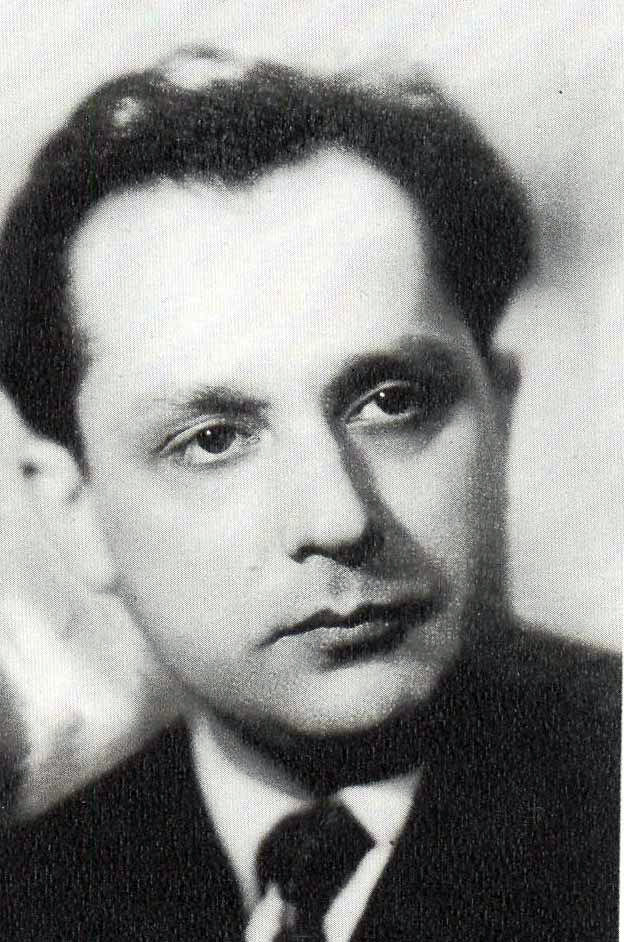
- Born: 15 August 1919; Tambov, Russia
- Died: 20 December 2012 (aged 93); Moscow, Russia
- Education: Moscow Conservatory
- Occupations: Classical pianist; Academic teacher
- Awards: People's Artist of the USSR

Victor Karpovich Merzhanov (Russian: Ви́ктор Ка́рпович Мержа́нов; 15 August 1919 – 20 December 2012) was a Russian pianist, honoured as People's Artist of the USSR in 1990.

== Biography ==
Merzhanov was born in Tambov and studied at Tambov Musical College with Solomon Starikov and Alexander Poltoratsky. Between 1936 and 1941 he studied at the Moscow Conservatory in the classes of Samuil Feinberg (piano) and Alexander Goedicke (organ), graduating with distinction.

He achieved international recognition as a pianist in 1945 when he won the first prize (shared with Sviatoslav Richter) at the Third All-Soviet-Union Piano Competition. In 1949, he was placed tenth at the IV International Chopin Piano Competition in Warsaw. Merzhanov became a Moscow Philharmony soloist in 1946.

Merzhanov was a professor at the Moscow Conservatory from 1947 until his death. Among his students are prize-winners of international competitions: Vladimir Bunin, Oleg Volkov, Igor Girfanov, Joanna Li, Yuri Didenko, Mikhail Olenev, Hideyo Harada, Lambis Vassiliadis, Lorenzo Turchi-Floris, Nazzareno Carusi, Tatiana Shebanova, Ruslan Sviridov, Irina Khovanskaya, Anna Yarovaya, Anahit Nersesyan, Elena Ulyanova, Nina Kasimirova (Kazymirova) and many others. His name is inscribed on the Moscow Conservatory's marble wall along with those of Alexander Scriabin and Sergei Rachmaninoff. He was also a professor at the Tambov Rachmaninov Institute.

During his 60-year stage career, he gave more than 2,000 recitals and concerts in Russia, Europe, the United States, China, and other countries, with among others Lorin Maazel, Kurt Sanderling, Kirill Kondrashin, Nikolai Anosov, Aleksandr Gauk, Gennady Rozhdestvensky, Yuri Temirkanov and Yevgeny Svetlanov.

His recordings (recorded for the Soviet label Melodiya and subsequently also released by various labels in the United States, Italy and Japan) show his repertoire, including works from the Baroque period to contemporary music, from works by Bach and Beethoven to those by Prokofiev and Shostakovich.

From the start of his career he championed contemporary classical music. He was chosen by Prokofiev to give the first performance of his Sixth Sonata. He sat as a jury member in more than 40 international competitions including the Rachmaninov Competition (which he founded), the International Tchaikovsky Competition in Moscow, the Chopin Competition in Warsaw, the Bartók-Liszt Competition in Budapest, and international competitions in Montreal, Tokyo, Brussels and others. In addition Merzhanov was the artistic director of the Rachmaninov Piano Courses and contributed to the Rachmaninov Museum at the Ivanovka estate near Tambov.

Victor Merzhanov died on 20 December 2012 in Moscow. He is buried at the Novodevichy Cemetery.
