= List of ambassadors of Italy to Bulgaria =

Coordinates: 42.695039°N 23.331130°E

Ambassador of Italy to Bulgaria
- Emblem of Italy

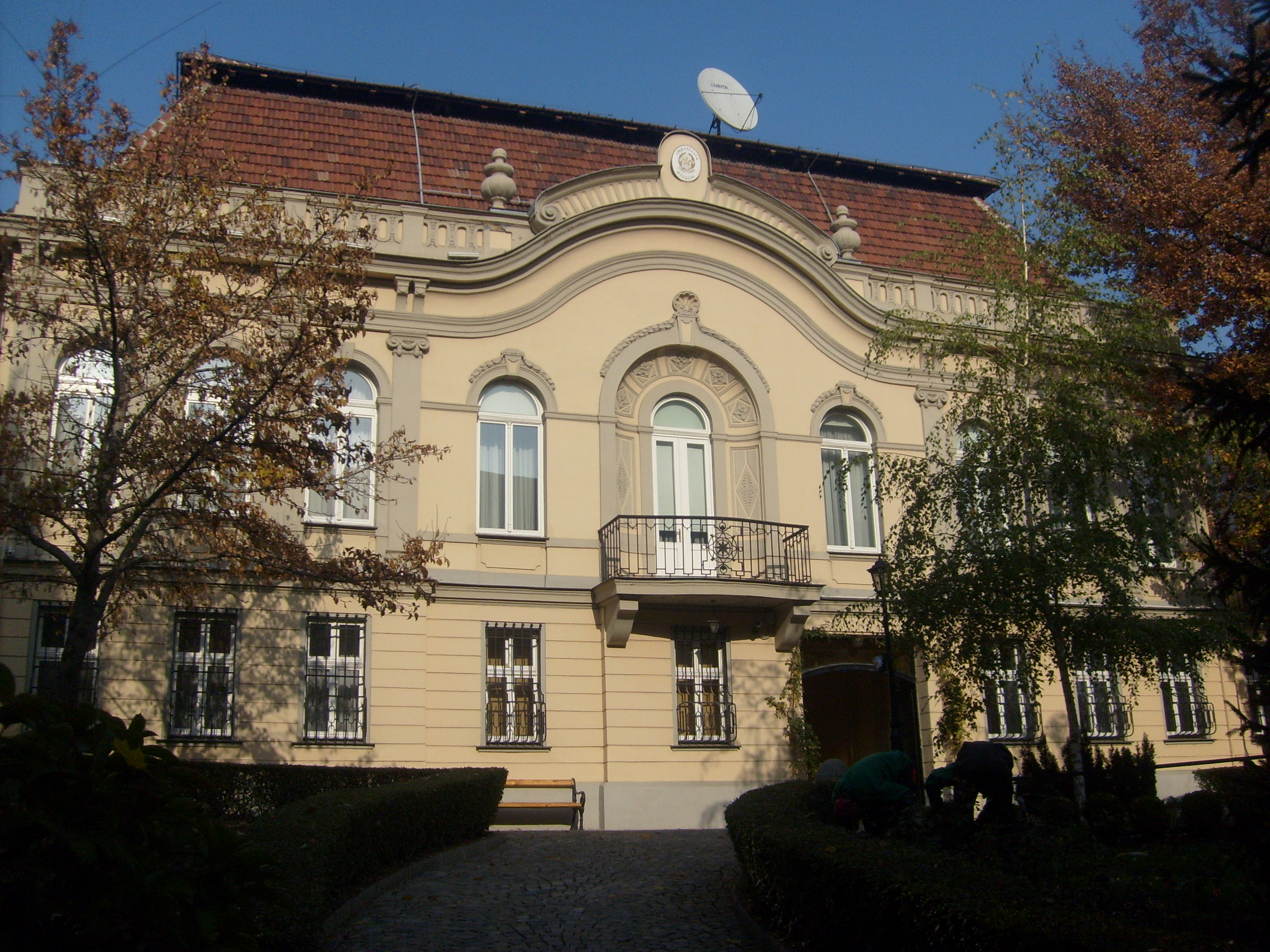
- Inaugural holder: Domenico Brunenghi
- Formation: July 3, 1879
- Website: http://ambsofia.esteri.it

The Italian ambassador in Sofia is the official representative of the Government in Rome to the Government of Bulgaria.

== History ==
In the period preceding the liberation of Bulgaria from Ottoman rule, Italian Consulates were already active in the main cities of the country - Plovdiv, Ruse and Sofia. After the end of the Russo-Turkish War of 1877-1878, Italy maintained its Consulates in the first two centres and opened new ones in the ports of Lom (1881), Varna (1889) and Burgas (1903).

On 25 December 1879 in the Royal Palace of Sofia, Domenico Brunenghi solemnly presented his credentials to Prince Alexander I of Bulgaria.

== List of representatives ==
Diplomatic accreditation	Ambassador	Observations	List of prime ministers of Italy	Prime Minister of Bulgaria	Term end
July 3, 1879	Domenico Brunenghi	Agent and consul general with letter of credentials	Benedetto Cairoli	Todor Burmov	
February 9, 1880	Renato De Martino	March 6, 1898 Italian ambassador to China	Benedetto Cairoli	Dragan Tsankov	
January 24, 1884	Carlo Alberto Gerbaix de Sonnax		Agostino Depretis	Petko Karavelov	
June 29, 1893	Alessandro Riva		Francesco Crispi	Stefan Stambolov	
November 24, 1895	Giulio Silvestrelli		Francesco Crispi	Konstantin Stoilov	
August 9, 1901	Giorgio Polacco († 1902)	With royal decree of November 9, 1902: Giorgio Polacco, comm. extraordinary envoy and 2nd class plenipotentiary minister, placed, on his request, on leave for health reasons from November 15, 1902. On 9 December 1902, the comm. Ceased to live in Milan. Giorgio Polacco, extraordinary envoy and 2nd class plenipotentiary minister.	Giuseppe Zanardelli	Petko Karavelov	November 9, 1902
May 12, 1903	Guglielmo Imperiali	1891 Marquis Guglielmo Imperiali di Francavilla, head of the Italian Legation in Washington, D.C., Chargé d'affaires of the Italian ambassador to the United States	Giovanni Giolitti	Racho Petrov	
March 31, 1904	Fausto Cucchi Boasso	agent and consul general letter of credentials	Giovanni Giolitti	Racho Petrov	
May 6, 1909	Fausto Cucchi Boasso	extraordinary envoy and plenipotentiary minister, with letter of credentials	Sidney Sonnino	Aleksandar Malinov	
June 23, 1910	Alessandro De Bosdari	From 1922 to 1926 he was Italian ambassador to Germany	Luigi Luzzatti	Aleksandar Malinov	
February 23, 1913	Fausto Cucchi Boasso		Giovanni Giolitti	Stoyan Danev	
September 14, 1920	Luigi Aldrovandi Marescotti		Francesco Saverio Nitti	Aleksandar Stamboliyski	
January 22, 1923	Sabino Rinella	Sabino Rinella, the Italian charge d'affaires in Belgrade, reported that the Serbians gratefully attributed their recent successes largely to Rumania's attitude.	Benito Mussolini	Aleksandar Stamboliyski	
May 26, 1926	Renato Piacentini	Mussolini inviò Amadori a Riga, sostituendolo con il ministro a Riga, Renato Piacentini	Benito Mussolini	Andrey Lyapchev	
January 29, 1931	Giuliano Corà	extraordinary envoy and plenipotentiary minister, with letter of credentials	Benito Mussolini	Aleksandar Malinov	
December 31, 1934	Giuseppe Sapuppo	extraordinary envoy and plenipotentiary minister	Benito Mussolini	Kimon Georgiev	
October 27, 1937	Giuseppe Talamo Atenolfi		Benito Mussolini	Georgi Kyoseivanov	
January 29, 1940	Massimo Magistrati		Benito Mussolini	Georgi Kyoseivanov	
June 7, 1943	Francesco Giorgio Mameli	extraordinary envoy and plenipotentiary minister	Pietro Badoglio	Dobri Bozhilov	
September 21, 1945	Piero Vinci	Chargé d'affaires	Ferruccio Parri	Kimon Georgiev	
December 14, 1958	Giovanni-Battista Guarnaschelli	extraordinary envoy and plenipotentiary minister	Amintore Fanfani	Anton Yugov	
January 22, 1952	Gastone Rossi Longhi	1960: Ambasciatore d'ltaiia ¡n Lima	Ferruccio Parri	Valko Chervenkov	
April 27, 1955	Filippo Muzi Falconi		Antonio Segni	Valko Chervenkov	
December 16, 1958	Roberto Gaja		Amintore Fanfani	Anton Yugov	
February 26, 1963	Orazio Antinori di Castel San Pietro Aquae Ortus	extraordinary envoy and plenipotentiary minister	Giovanni Leone	Todor Zhivkov	
September 2, 1964	Orazio Antinori di Castel San Pietro Aquae Ortus	Ambassador	Giovanni Leone	Todor Zhivkov	
April 7, 1968	Giuseppe Puri Purini		Giovanni Leone	Todor Zhivkov	
January 13, 1972	Franz Cancellario d'Alena	Franz Cancellario d'Alena ist am 16. Januar 1957 das Exequatur der Bundesregierung erteilt worden.	Giulio Andreotti	Stanko Todorov	
January 10, 1979	Franz Cancellario d'Alena		Francesco Cossiga	Stanko Todorov	
June 9, 1980	Carlo Maria Rossi Arnaud		Francesco Cossiga	Stanko Todorov	
April 9, 1984	Giovanni Battistini		Bettino Craxi	Grisha Filipov	
November 21, 1987	Paolo Tarony		Amintore Fanfani	Georgi Atanasov (politician)	
February 12, 1990	Agostino Mathis		Giulio Andreotti	Andrey Lukanov	
June 24, 1994	Stefano Rastrelli		Silvio Berlusconi	Reneta Indzhova	
October 31, 1996	Tommaso Troise		Romano Prodi	Zhan Videnov	
April 28, 1999	Alessandro Grafini		Massimo D’Alema	Ivan Kostov	
May 9, 2003	Giovan Battista Campagnola		Silvio Berlusconi	Simeon Sakskoburggotski	
May 16, 2008	Stefano Benazzo		Silvio Berlusconi	Sergei Stanishev	
September 3, 2012	Marco Conticelli		Mario Monti	Boyko Borisov	
September 19, 2016	Stefano Baldi		Matteo Renzi	Boyko Borisov	January 2, 2021
January 5, 2021	Giuseppina Zarra		Mario Draghi	Boyko Borisov	October 22, 2022
