= Stefano Baldi =

Italian diplomat (born 1961)

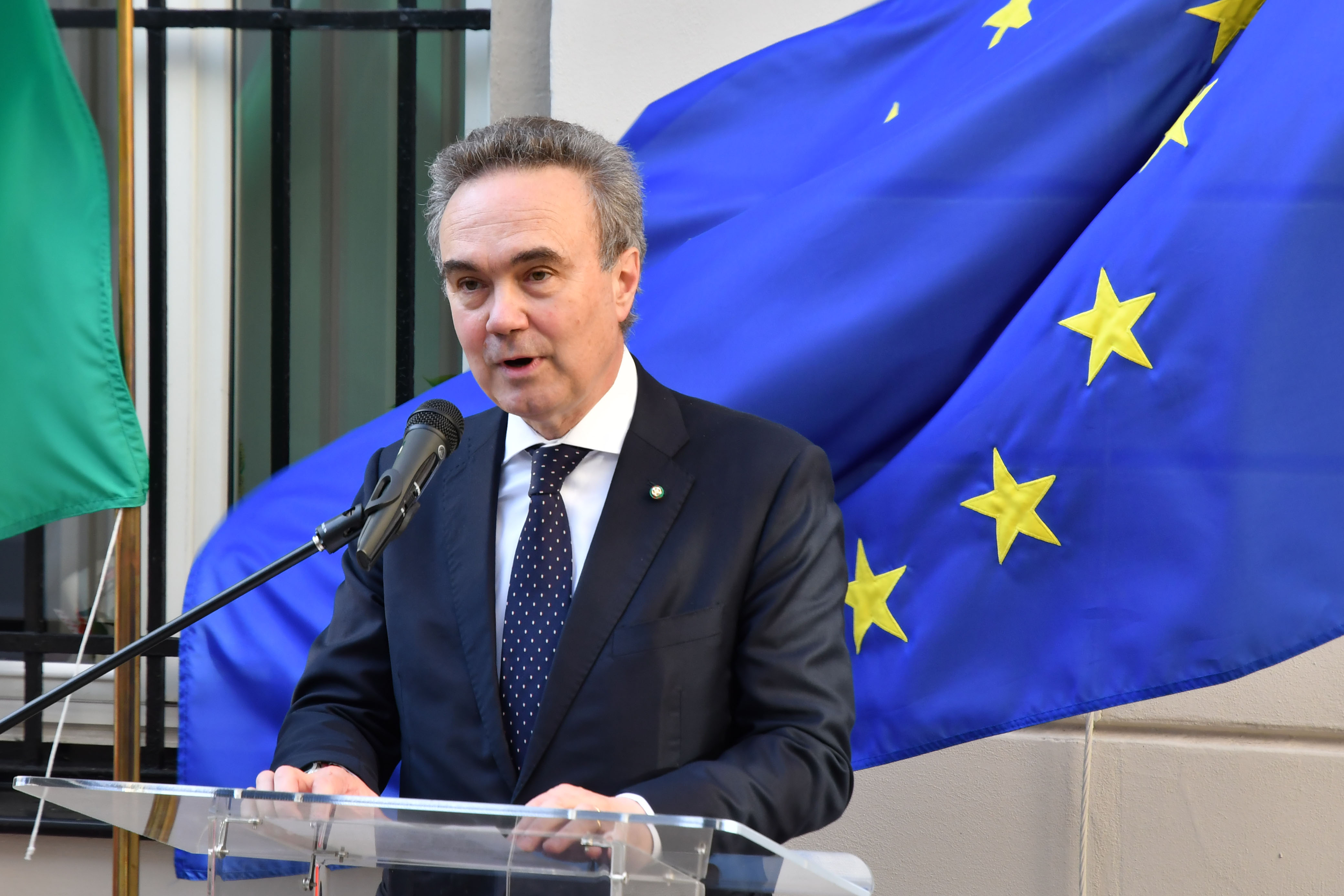
- Amb. Stefano Baldi on the occasion of the celebrations of the National Day of Italy in Sofia (30 May 2019)

Permanent Representative of Italy to OSCE - Vienna
- In office 4 January 2021 – 15 September 2024
- Preceded by: Alessandro Azzoni
- Succeeded by: Andrea Cascone

Ambassador of Italy to Bulgaria
- In office 19 September 2016 – 3 January 2021
- Preceded by: Marco Conticelli
- Succeeded by: Giuseppina Zarra

Personal details
- Born: 8 April 1961 (age 65) Città della Pieve, Italy
- Education: University of Rome - Sapienza
- Profession: Diplomat, author

Stefano Baldi is an Italian ambassador and author. From 2016 to 2020, he was the Ambassador to Bulgaria. From January 4, 2021 to September 15, 2024 he was the Permanent Representative of Italy to the Organization for Security and Co-operation in Europe (OSCE).

== Biography ==
=== Diplomatic career ===
After obtaining a degree in economics from Sapienza University in 1985, he began his diplomatic career in 1989 at the Italian Ministry of Foreign Affairs and was assigned to the Directorate-General for Economic Affairs.

In 1991, he was Deputy Ambassador to Tanzania and from 1995 to 1999, he served as First Secretary of the Italian Permanent Representation to the International Organisations in Geneva. Back at the Foreign Ministry in 1999, he was named Head of the Statistical Office within the Analysis and Programming Unit of the General-Secretariat, led by Ambassador Roberto Toscano.

Starting in 2002, he worked as First Counsellor at the Italian Permanent Representation to the United Nations in New York, responsible for the 1st Commission of the General Assembly on disarmament and non-proliferation issues. From 2006 to 2010, he served as Relex Counsellor in the context of the Common Foreign and Security Policy at the Italian Permanent Representation to the European Union in Brussels. Upon his return to the Foreign Ministry in 2010, he was named Head of the scientific and technological cooperation unit.

From 2011 to 2016, he was the Head of training department at the Foreign Ministry, first as Director of the Diplomatic Institute "Mario Toscano" and from 2014 as Head of the Training Unit within the Directorate-General for Resources and Innovation.

From September 19, 2016, to January 3, 2021, he served as Ambassador of Italy to Bulgaria.

In 2019 he has produced, together with the Italian composer Lorenzo Turchi-Floris, a cultural show entitled "Journey in Italy" to get to know some of the Italian Regions through their popular musical tradition arranged in a classical key for tenor and piano.

From January 4, 2021, to September 14, 2024, he was Italy's Permanent Representative to the OSCE in Vienna.

He collaborates with numerous Italian universities (Sapienza University of Rome, Roma Tre University, LUMSA, University of Pavia, University of Trento, University of Forlì) where he organizes seminar series and courses on diplomacy and international affairs.

He has participated as a speaker to three TEDx: on 20 April 2020 at TEDxUNITN (Trento) dedicated to "The Pulse of Innovation" on 3 October 2015 at TEDxBari (Bari) dedicated to "Resilience", on 27 January 2018 at TEDxVitosha (Sofia) dedicated to "Happy People".

== Awards ==
On November 26, 2019, he received the "Docendo Discimus" award of the Bulgarian Foreign Ministry's Diplomatic Institute for his significant contribution to the development of the Diplomatic Institute.

In June 2020, he was awarded the "Sign of Honour" of the New Bulgarian University (NBU) for his significant contribution and the fruitful collaboration between the NBU and the Italian Embassy in Bulgaria and the support, generosity and efforts of the mission towards the New Bulgarian University.

On November 19, 2019, he received the diploma and badge of honour "Golden Age" from the Bulgarian Ministry of Culture for his significant contribution to international cultural cooperation between the Republic of Bulgaria and the Republic of Italy.

On June 26, 2021, he was assigned the Culture Award in the Context of the Premium International Florence Seven Stars in Florence.

== Honours ==
Officer of the Order of Merit of the Italian Republic – December 27, 2006

Knight of the Order of Merit of the Italian Republic – June 2, 2001

Grand Officer Cross pro Merito Melitensi – June 20, 2014

Order of The Madara Horseman (1st Class) – September 23, 2020

== Publications ==
- 1999 (with Raimondo Cagiano de Azevedo) – La popolazione italiana verso il 2000. Storia demografica dal dopoguerra ad oggi (Il Mulino, ISBN 88-15-06246-7)
- 2000 (with Jovan Kurbalija) – Internet Guide for Diplomats (Diplo Publishing, ISBN 99909-55-12-3) (also digital version)
- 2000 (with Antonio Enrico Bartoli) - Carriere Internazionali (Il Sole 24 Ore, ISBN 88-8363-740-2)
- 2003 (with Eduardo Gelbstein and Jovan Kurbalija) – The Information Society Library, (DiploFoundation) (also digital version)
- 2006 (with Cinzia Buccianti) - Le Nazioni Unite viste da vicino. Aspetti e problemi dell'attività dell'ONU e dell'azione dell'Italia (CEDAM, ISBN 88-13-26203-5)
- 2006 (with Pasquale Baldocci) - La penna del diplomatico. I libri scritti dai diplomatici dal dopoguerra ad oggi (FrancoAngeli, ISBN 88-464-7322-1)
- 2007 (with Pasquale Baldocci) – Through the Diplomatic Looking Glass, (DiploFoundation, ISBN 978-99932-53-18-1)
- 2009 (with Gabriele Altana) - Vademecum della PESD. Breve guida della politica europea di sicurezza e difesa, (Ministero degli affari esteri)(also digital version)
- 2014 (edited by Stefano Baldi) - Un ricordo di Egidio Ortona (ISDI press. Ministero degli Affari Esteri e della Cooperazione Internazionale)
- 2014 (edited by Stefano Baldi) - Un ricordo di Pietro Quaroni (UNAP Press. Ministero degli Affari Esteri e della Cooperazione Internazionale)
- 2016 (edited by Stefano Baldi) - Un ricordo di Roberto Gaja (UNAP Press. Ministero degli Affari Esteri e della Cooperazione Internazionale)
- 2017 – The European Union is 60 years old. Is it too young or too old?, (Embassy of Italy, Sofia)
- 2018 (editor with Giuseppe Nesi) – Diplomatici. 33 saggi su aspetti giuridici e politici della diplomazia contemporanea, (Editoriale Scientifica, ISBN 978-88-9391-235-8) (also digital version)
- 2018 - Cultura in Residenza. L'esperienza dell'Ambasciata d'Italia a Sofia, (Embassy of Italy, Sofia) (also digital version)
- 2019 - Storia delle Relazioni Diplomatiche tra Italia e Bulgaria attraverso i documenti diplomatici italiani (Paradigma, ISBN 978-954-326-391-2) (also digital version)
- 2020 - Ambasciatori d’Italia a Sofia. I protagonisti di 140 anni di relazioni diplomatiche fra Italia e Bulgaria (Embassy of Italy, Sofia) (also digital version)
- 2020 (editor with Alexandre Kustov) - 140 anni di relazioni fra Italia e Bulgaria. Diplomazia, Economia, Cultura (1879–2019) (Tendril Publishing House, ISBN 978-619-91496-0-7) (also digital version)
- 2020 - Album Fotografico - 140 anni di Relazioni diplomatiche fra Italia e Bulgaria (Embassy of Italy, Sofia, ISBN 978-619-91508-1-8) (also digital version)
- 2020 – Diplomatic Images. Discovering diplomats through historical photos (1861–1961), (Embassy of Italy, Sofia, ISBN 978-619-91508-2-5)
- 2020 - 140 anni di relazioni fra Italia e Bulgaria. Diplomazia, Economia, Cultura (1879–2019) (Tendril Publishing House, ISBN 978-619-91496-0-7) (also digital version)
- 2021 - L'Italia alle Riunioni del Consiglio dei Ministri dell'Organizzazione per la Sicurezza e la Cooperazione in Europa (OSCE). Raccolta degli interventi delle Delegazioni italiane 2000-2020 (Permanent Representation of Italy to the OSCE, Vienna) (also digital version)
- 2022 - L'Italia nell'OSCE. Iniziative ed interventi dell'Italia nell'Organizzazione per la Sicurezza e la Cooperazione in Europa (Permanent Representation of Italy to the OSCE, Vienna) (also digital version)
- 2023 - Inside the OSCE. Papers from the seminars for Italian universities on the Organization for Security and Co-operation in Europe, (Editoriale Scientifica, ISBN 979-12-5976-712-7) (also digital version)

== See also ==
- Ministry of Foreign Affairs (Italy)
- Foreign relations of Italy
- List of ambassadors of Italy
- Diplomacy
- List of ambassadors of Italy to Bulgaria
- Organization for Security and Co-operation in Europe
