= Paolo Isotta =

Italian writer (1950–2021)

- Born: 18 October 1950; Naples, Italy
- Died: 12 February 2021 (aged 70); Naples, Italy
- Education: University of Naples
- Occupations: Music journalist and writer
- Writing career
- Period: 1974–2021
- Notable works: Il ventriloquo di Dio; La virtù dell'elefante/ La dotta lira. Ovidio e la musica/ Verdi a Parigi

Paolo Isotta (18 October 1950 – 12 February 2021) was an Italian musicologist and writer.

== Life ==
Isotta graduated from the University of Naples, where he studied classic Letters and law. He also studied piano with Vincenzo Vitale and composition with Renato Parodi and Renato Dionisi. From 1971 to 1994, he was ordinary professor of history of music in the Conservatory of Turin and Naples. In February 2019, he was named Professor Emeritus.

He was the musical critic for the Italian newspaper Corriere della Sera from 1980 to 2015 and for other journals such as Il Giornale.

In 2013 he published a critical article against Daniel Harding and, indirectly, Claudio Abbado, following which Stéphane Lissner, La Scala's director, banned him from the theatre.

He wrote several books of musical criticism, among these one on the influence of the music in the Works of Thomas Mann and one which is the first ever written about the influence of the poetry of Ovid on music from the XV to the XXI century.

== Decorations and awards ==
- 2006: Italian Order of Merit for Culture and Art
- 2017: Isaiah Berlin Prize

== Works ==
- Antonio Caldara: problemi e prospettive (1971)
- I diamanti della corona. Grammatica del Rossini napoletano (1974)
- I sentieri della musica (1978)
- Dixit Dominus Domino meo. Struttura e semantica in Haendel e Vivaldi (1980)
- Il ventriloquo di Dio: Thomas Mann e la musica nell'opera letteraria (1983)
- Le ali di Wieland (1984)
- Per una lettura de "Il Turco in Italia", (1985)
- Protagonisti della musica (1988)
- Victor de Sabata: un compositore (1992)
- Omaggio a Renata Tebaldi (2002)
- La virtù dell'elefante (Marsilio, 2014)
- Altri canti di Marte (Marsilio, 2015)
- La bellezza nell'estetica dei 'Meistersinger' di Richard Wagner (2016)
- Paisiello e il mito di Fedra (2016)
- Othello: Shakespeare, Napoli, Rossini (2016)
- Jérusalem: Verdi et la persécution de l'honneur (Liège, 2017)
- Il canto degli animali. I nostri fratelli e i loro sentimenti in musica e in poesia (Marsilio, 2017)
- De Parthenopes musices disciplina. L'educazione musicale a Napoli dal Medio Evo ai giorni nostri (Napoli, 2018)
- "Non si pasce di cibo mortale chi si pasce di cibo celeste". Il convito e la fame tra mito, musica, poesia e teatro napoletano (Ariano Irpino, 2018)
- La dotta lira. Ovidio e la musica (Marsilio, 2018)
- La tradizione napoletana dei Responsori per la Settimana Santa. Tenebra della Passione e luce di Leonardo Leo, "Napoli Nobilissima", 2018
- Rossini 1868-2018. Schizzo per un ritratto, Roma, 2018
- La rivoluzione estetica del "Rigoletto", Roma 2019
- Osmo, musica, uomo nell'antichità e Dante, Ariano Irpito, Edizioni Biogem, 2019
- Verdi a Parigi, Venezia, Marsilio, 2020

== Sources ==
- Zurletti, Sara (22 January 2015). De la critique musicale à la "transvaluation" de la musique italienne : le cas de Paolo Isotta, critique musical du Corriere della sera. Le technicien et l’écrivain. Questionner la légitimité des figures de la critique musicale du XXe siècle à nos jours (in French). Paris-Sorbonne University.
