= List of ambassadors to France =

The following is the list of ambassadors to France. Note that some diplomats are accredited by, or to, more than one country.

== Current ambassadors to Paris ==
Sending country	Ambassador	Credentials (As of 12 April 2019)	Embassy location	Embassy website
Afghanistan	Abdel-Ellah Sediqi	26 July 2016	Paris	
Albania	Dritan Tola	25 March 2013	Paris	
Algeria	Abdelkader Mesdoua	18 December 2017	Paris	
Andorra	Cristina Rodriguez Galán	6 July 2015	Paris	
Angola	João Bernardo de Miranda	31 August 2018	Paris	
Argentina	Mario Raùl Veron Guerra	31 August 2018	Paris	
Armenia	Hasmik Tolmajyan	31 August 2018	Paris	
Australia	Brendan E. Berne	18 December 2017	Paris	
Austria	Barbara Kaudel-Jensen	September 2024	Paris	
Azerbaijan	Leyla Abdullayeva	17 October 2022	Paris	
Bahamas	Eldred Edison Bethel	22 February 2013	London, UK	
Bahrain	Muhammad Abdul Ghaffar Abdulla	8 September 2015	Paris	
Bangladesh	Kazi Imtiaz Hossein)	18 December 2017	Paris	
Barbados	Joy-Ann Skinner	12 April 2019	Brussels, Belgium	
Belarus	Igor Fissenko	12 April 2019	Paris	
Belgium	François de Kerchove d'Exaerde	12 April 2019	Paris	
Belize	Dylan Vernon	8 July 2014	Brussels, Belgium	
Benin	Auguste Comlan Alavo	23 February 2017	Paris	
Bolivia	Juan Gonzalo Duran Flores	13 October 2017	Paris	
Bosnia and Herzegovina	Kemal Muftić	31 August 2018	Paris	
Botswana	Samuel Otsile Outlule	6 June 2011	Brussels, Belgium	
Brazil	Paulo Cesar De Oliveira Campos	6 July 2015	Paris	
Brunei Darussalam	Datin Malai Hajah Halimah Malai Haji Yussof	9 November 2016	Paris	
Bulgaria	Anguel Tcholakov	15 November 2013	Paris	
Burkina Faso	Alain Francis Gustave Ilboudo	9 November 2016	Paris	
Burundi	Spès Caritas Njebarikanuye	13 March 2026	Paris	
Cabo Verde	Hercules do Nascimento Cruz	18 December 2017	Paris	
Cambodia	Chem Widhya	26 July 2016	Paris	
Cameroon	Samuel Mvondo Ayolo	26 July 2016	Paris	
Canada	Isabelle Hudon	18 December 2017	Paris	
Central African Republic	Michel Gbezera-Bria	29 January 2015	Paris	
Chad	Amin Abba-Sidick	13 October 2017	Paris	
Chile	Juan Salazar Sparks	12 April 2019	Paris	
China	Deng Li	7 January 2025	Paris	
Colombia	Viviane Morales Hoyos	12 April 2019	Paris	
Comoros	Mohamed Soulaimana	18 December 2017	Paris	
Congo	Rodolphe Adada	9 November 2016	Paris	
Costa Rica	Sonia Marta Mora Escalante	12 April 2019	Paris	
Cote D'Ivoire	Charles Providence Gomis	22 February 2013	Paris	
Croatia	Filip Vičak	18 December 2017	Paris	
Cuba	Elio Eduardo Rodriguez Perdomo	18 December 2017	Paris	
Cyprus	Pantelakis D. Eliades	9 November 2016	Paris	
Czech Republic	Petr Drulak	23 February 2017	Paris	
Democratic Republic of Congo	Christian Ileka Atoki	22 December 2011	Paris	
Denmark	Michael Starbæk Christensen	12 April 2019	Paris	
Djibouti	Ayeid Mousseid Yahya	8 July 2014	Paris	
Dominican Republic	Rosa Margarita Hernandez Caamano De Grullon	22 February 2013	Paris	
Ecuador	Maria de la Paz Donoso Castellon	6 July 2015	Paris	
Egypt	Ehab Ahmed Badawy	31 October 2014	Paris	
El Salvador	Carmen Maria Gallardo Hernandez	9 November 2016	Paris	
Equatorial Guinea	Miguel Oyono Ndong Mifumu	31 October 2014	Paris	
Eritrea	Hanna Simon	8 July 2014	Paris	
Estonia	Lembit Uibo	2021	Paris	
Ethiopia	Henok Teferra Shawl	12 April 2019	Paris	
Fiji	Deo Saran	8 September 2015	Brussels, Belgium	
Finland	Teemu Tanner	31 August 2018	Paris	
Gabon	Flavien Enongoue	13 October 2017	Paris	
Gambia	Sedat Jobe	18 December 2017	Paris	
Georgia	Ecaterine Siradze-Delaunay	11 July 2013	Paris	
Germany	Stephan Steinlein	August 2023	Paris	
Ghana	Anna Bossman	13 October 2017	Paris	
Greece	Aglaïa Balta	31 August 2018	Paris	
Grenada	Stephen Fletcher	2 July 2010	Brussels, Belgium	
Guatemala	Luis Fernando Andrade Falla	31 August 2018	Paris	
Guinea	Amara Camara	6 June 2011	Paris	
Guinea Bissau	Filomena Mendes Mascarenhas Tipote	31 August 2018	Paris	
Guyana	Frederik Hamley Case	12 April 2019	London, UK	
Haiti	Vanessa Matignon	6 July 2015	Paris	
Holy See	Mgr Luigi Ventura	15 January 2010	Paris	
Honduras	Carmen Eleonora Ortez Williams	3 December 2010	Paris	
Hungary	Georges Karolyi	29 January 2015	Paris	
Iceland	Kristjan Andri Stefansson	9 November 2016	Paris	
India	Vinay Mohan Kwatra	13 October 2017	Paris	
Indonesia	Mohamad Oemar	12 April 2019	Paris	
Iraq	Abdulrahman Hamid Al-Hussaini	12 April 2019	Paris	
Iran	Abolghassem Delfi	18 December 2017	Paris	
Ireland	Patricia O'Brien	13 October 2017	Paris	
Israel	Aliza Bin-Noun	8 September 2015	Paris	
Italy	Teresa Castaldo	31 August 2018	Paris	
Jamaica	Sheila Monteith	31 August 2018	Brussels, Belgium	
Japan	Masato Kitera	26 July 2016	Paris	
Jordan	Bisher Hani Al-Khasawneh	12 April 2019	Paris	
Kazakhstan	Gulsara Arystanqulova	16 October 2022	Paris	
Kenya	Judy Wakhungu	4 March 2019	Paris	
Kosovo	Qëndrim Gashi	26 July 2016	Paris	
Kuwait	Sami Mohammad Al-Sulaiman	15 February 2016	Paris	
Kyrgyzstan	Asein Isaev	26 July 2016	Paris	
Laos	Yong Chanthalangsy	23 February 2017	Paris	
Latvia	Imants Liegis	26 July 2016	Paris	
Lebanon	Rami Adwan	18 December 2017	Paris	
Lesotho	Retselisitsoe Calvin Masenyetse	31 August 2018	Berlin, Germany	
Liberia	Tracy Ashley Grigsby	4 September 2023	Paris	
Libya	Hamed Elhouderi	12 April 2019	Paris	
Lithuania	Dahus Cekuolis	31 October 2014	Paris	
Luxembourg	Martine Schommer	13 October 2017	Paris	
Macedonia	Jadranka Chaushevska Dimov	31 August 2018	Paris	
Madagascar	Rajaonarivony Narisoa	22 April 2008	Paris	
Malawi	Tedson Aubrey Kalebe	15 February 2016	Brussels, Belgium	
Malaysia	Azfar Mohamad Mustafar	12 April 2019	Paris	
Maldives	Farahanaz Faizal	6 June 2011	Brussels, Belgium	
Mali	Toumani Djimé Diallo	31 August 2018	Paris	
Malta	Carmelo Inguanez	9 December 2019	Paris	
Mauritania	Aichetou Mint M'Haiham	26 July 2016	Paris	
Mauritius	Vijayen Valaydon	13 October 2017	Paris	
Mexico	Juan Manuel Gómez Robledo Verduzco	15 February 2016	Paris	
Moldova	Emil Druc	13 October 2017	Paris	
Monaco	Christophe Steiner	12 April 2019	Paris	
Mongolia	Avirmid Battur	12 April 2019	Paris	
Montenegro	Dragica Ponorac	6 July 2015	Paris	
Morocco	Chakib Benmoussa	25 March 2013	Paris	
Mozambique	Alberto Mavarengue Augusto	12 April 2019	Paris	
Myanmar	Kyaw Zeya	31 August 2018	Paris	
Namibia	Albertus Aochamub	12 April 2019	Paris	
Nepal	Dipak Adhikari	12 April 2019	Paris	
Netherlands	Pieter De Gooijer	13 October 2017	Paris	
New Zealand	Jane Coombs	13 October 2017	Paris	
Nicaragua	Ruth Esperanza Tapia Roa	26 October 2012	Paris	
Niger	Ado Elhadji Abou	8 September 2015	Paris	
Nigeria	Modupe Irele	18 December 2017	Paris	
Norway	Oda Helen Sletnes	12 April 2019	Paris	
Oman	Cheikh Ghazi bin Saïd bin Abdallah AlBahr Al Rawas	18 December 2017	Paris	
Pakistan	Moin Ul Haque	9 November 2016	Paris	
Panama	José A. Fabrega Roux	18 December 2017	Paris	
Papua New Guinea	Joshua Rimarkindu Kalinoe	6 July 2015	Brussels, Belgium	
Paraguay	Emilio Lorenzo Giménez Franco	11 July 2012	Paris	
Peru	Christina Maria del Rosario Ronquillo de Blodörn	12 April 2019	Paris	
Philippines	Maria Theresa Pareno Lazaro	8 July 2014	Paris	
Poland	Tomasz Młynarski	13 October 2017	Paris	
Portugal	Jorge Torres Pereira	18 December 2017	Paris	
Qatar	Ali Bin Jassim Thani Jassil Al-Thani	12 April 2019	Paris	
Romania	Ioana Bivolaru	26 July 2023	Paris	
Russia	Alexey Meshkov	18 December 2017	Paris	
Rwanda	Jacques Kabale Nyangezi	2 July 2010	Paris	
Saint Lucia	Ernest Hilaire	8 July 2014	London, UK	
Samoa	Fatumanava Pa'olelei Luteru	26 October 2012	Brussels, Belgium	
San Marino	Savina Zafferani	15 February 2016	Paris	
Sao Tome and Principe	Carlos Gustavo Dos Anjos	2 October 2010	Brussels, Belgium	
Saudi Arabia	Khalid Mohammed Al Ankary	15 February 2016	Paris	
Senegal	Bassirou Sene	8 September 2015	Paris	
Serbia	Natasa Maric	12 April 2019	Paris	
Seychelles	Luis Sylvestre Radegonde	13 October 2017	Paris	
Sierra Leone	Samuel Tamba Musa	12 April 2019	Brussels, Belgium	
Singapore	Zainal Arif Mantaha	8 September 2015	Paris	
Slovakia	Igor Slobodnik	13 October 2017	Paris	
Slovenia	Andrej Slapnicar	8 September 2015	Paris	
Solomon Islands	Moses Kouni Mose	15 February 2016	Brussels, Belgium	
Somalia	Sharif Ahmed	9 November 2016	Paris	
South Africa	Rapulane Sydney Molekane	29 January 2015	Paris	
South Korea	Jong-moon Choi	31 August 2018	Paris	
South Sudan	Lazaro Akoi Arou Lukuac	9 November 2016	Paris	
Spain	Fernando Carderera Soler	13 October 2017	Paris	
Sri Lanka	Buddhi K. Athauda	18 December 2017	Paris	
Sudan	Daffa-Alla Elhag Ali Osman	9 November 2016	Paris	
Suriname	Reggy Martiales Nelson	6 July 2015	Paris	
Swaziland	Sibusisiwe Mngomezulu	31 August 2018	Brussels, Belgium	
Sweden	Veronika Wand-Danielsson	31 October 2014	Paris	
Switzerland	Livia Leu Agosti	12 April 2019	Paris	
Tajikistan	Jamoliddin Ubaidullo	31 August 2018	Paris	
Tanzania	Samuel Shelukindo	23 February 2017	Paris	
Thailand	Sarun Charoensuwam	12 April 2019	Paris	
Togo	Calixte Batossie Madjoulba	3 December 2010	Paris	
Tonga	Sione Ngongo Kioa	2 July 2009	London, UK	
Trinidad and Tobago	Colin Connelly	23 February 2017	Brussels, Belgium	
Tunisia	Abdelaziz Rassaa	23 February 2017	Paris	
Turkey	Ismail Hakki Musa	23 February 2017	Paris	
Turkmenistan	Shohrat Jumayev	12 April 2019	Paris	
Uganda	Richard Nduhuura	13 October 2017	Paris	
Ukraine	Vadym Omelchenko	August 2020	Paris	
United Arab Emirates	Omar Saïf Saeed Ghobash	18 December 2017	Paris	
United Kingdom	Edward Llewellyn	9 November 2016	Paris	
United States	Jamie McCourt	18 December 2017	Paris	
Uruguay	Guillermo Dighiero Arrarte	15 February 2016	Paris	
Uzbekistan	Sardor Rustambaev	31 August 2018	Paris	
Vanuatu	Roy Mickey Joy	6 June 2011	Brussels, Belgium	
Venezuela	Héctor Michel Mujica Ricardo	20 February 2014	Paris	
Vietnam	Thiep Nguyen	31 August 2018	Paris	
Yemen	Reyad Yassin Abdullah	9 November 2016	Paris	
Zambia	Christine Kaseba-Sata	12 April 2019	Paris	
Zimbabwe	Rudo Mabel Chitiga	29 January 2015	Paris	
