= Modupe =

Yoruba name

Modúpẹ́
- Gender: Unisex
- Language: Yoruba

Origin
- Origin: Nigerian
- Meaning: I give thanks
- Region of origin: South-West Nigeria

Other names
- Nickname: Dúpẹ́

Modúpẹ́ // is a popular given name and rare surname of Yoruba origin which means "I give thanks.” Like most Yoruba names it is unisex, although Modupe is mostly used on girls due to its connotation.

== People with the given name ==
- Modupe Adeyeye (born 1992), English actress and model
- Modupe Akinola (born 1974), American psychologist
- Modupe Irele, Nigerian diplomat
- Modupe Jonah (born 1966), Sierra Leonean former middle-distance runner
- Modupe Omo-Eboh (1922–2002), Nigerian lawyer
- Modupe-Oreoluwa Ola (born 1990), Nigerian rapper
- Modupe Oshikoya (born 1954), former track and field athlete
- Modupe Ozolua (born 1973), Lebanese-Nigerian philanthropist

== People with the middle name ==
- Lateefat Modupe Okunnu (born 1939), Nigerian retired civil servant
- Manuela Modupe Udemba, Nigerian singer-songwriter, audio engineer, and record producer

== People with the surname ==
- Kagiso Modupe, South African actor and producer
