= Marcello Cerruti =

Italian diplomat and politician

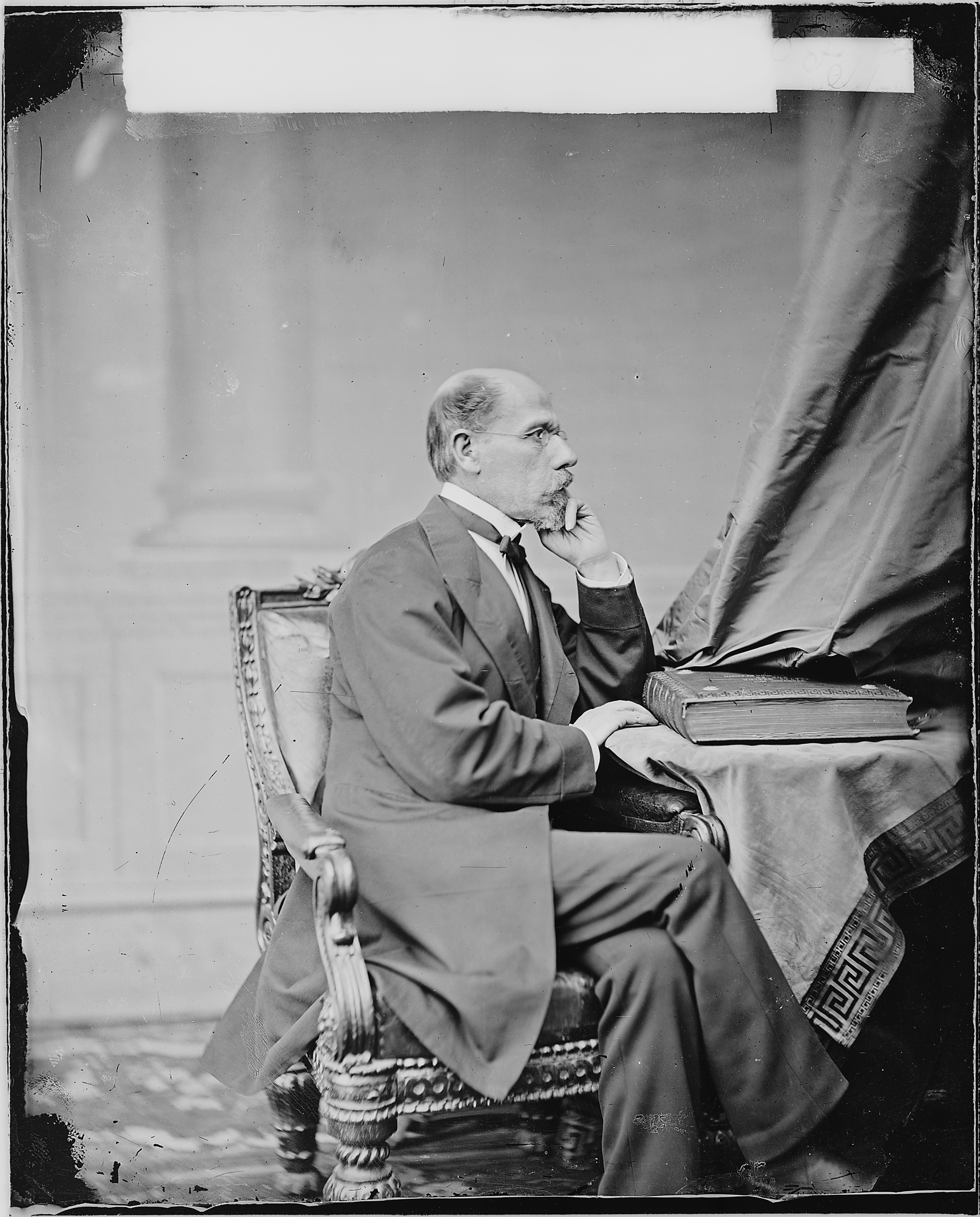
- Marcello Cerruti between circa 1860 and circa 1865 date

Personal details
- Born: July 16, 1808 Genova
- Died: 12 March 1896 (aged 87) Roma

Marcello Cerruti (Genoa, July 16, 1808 – Rome, March 12, 1896) was an Italian diplomat and politician. He was appointed senator of the Kingdom of Italy in 1870.

== Biography ==
A fellow student of Giuseppe Mazzini, he entered the diplomatic career of the Kingdom of Sardinia in 1825, at the consulate of Constantinople; he was then assigned to Tripoli (1831), Tunis (1836), Milan (1837) and Cyprus (1841). In 1845 he was a member of the Institute of Archaeological Correspondence in Rome and, in 1847, of the Eastern Archaeological Society of Germany.

After a short period at the Ministry, Cerrutti was chosen as Sardinian consul in Belgrade (1849). Here he provoked the protests of the Austrian government for his action in favour of the Hungarian refugees and the Italian legionaries who took refuge in the Serbian capital.

In 1850 he was recalled to Turin and, two years later, he was appointed Chargé d'affaires and Sardinian consul general in Brazil; in 1858 he held the same post in Buenos Aires. After being sent by Cavour on a special mission to Constantinople (September 1860), he was later appointed Secretary General of the Ministry of Foreign Affairs, a position he held from March 26, 1863, to December 30, 1866.

Subsequently he was plenipotentiary minister in Berne (1867), in Washington (1868), in The Hague (April 1869) and in Madrid (July 1869). On December 7, 1870, he was retired and, five days later, appointed Senator of the Kingdom.

== Honors ==
Grand cordon of the Order of Saints Maurice and Lazarus – January 27, 1867

Officer of the Order of Leopold of Belgium

Officer of the Legion of Honor

Officer of the Order of the Savior

Preceded by Luigi Corti	Italian ambassador to Spain; 1869–1870	Succeeded by Alberto Blanc
Preceded by Joseph Bertinatti	Italian Ambassador to the United States; 1867–1869	Succeeded by Luigi Corti
Preceded by Giacomo Durando	Italian ambassador to the Ottoman Empire; 1861–1862	Succeeded by Camillo Caracciolo Di Bella
Preceded by –	Italian ambassador to Argentina; 1856–1861	Succeeded by Raffaele Ulisse Barbolani
Preceded by Emilio Visconti Venosta	Secretary General of the Ministry of Foreign Affairs; 1863–1866	Succeeded by Anselmo Guerrieri Gonzaga
