= Blaise Rabetafika =

Malagasy diplomat (1932–2000)

President of the United Nations Security Council
- In office June 1986
- Preceded by: James Victor Gbeho
- Succeeded by: Birabhongse Kasemsri
- In office March 1985
- Preceded by: Natarajan Krishnan
- Succeeded by: Javier Arias Stella

Malagasy Ambassador to Cuba
- In office 1974 – September 1992

Malagasy Ambassador to Canada
- In office 1970–1989

Permanent Representative of Madagascar to the United Nations
- In office 1969 – September 1992

Personal details
- Born: 3 February 1932 Antananarivo, French Madagascar
- Died: 17 December 2000 (aged 68) Antananarivo, Madagascar
- Spouse: Jeanne Razafintsalama (m. 1956)
- Relations: Zina Andrianarivelo-Razafy; Serge Rahoërson (cousins)
- Children: 3
- Parent(s): Albert Joseph Rabetafika; Ramboahangimalala Hélène
- Education: University of Toulouse

Joseph Albert Blaise Rabetafika (3 February 1932 – 17 December 2000) was a Malagasy diplomat. He was Permanent Representative of Madagascar to the United Nations from 1969 to 1992, Malagasy Ambassador to Canada from 1970 to 1989, and Ambassador to Cuba from 1974 to 1992. In March 1985 and later in June 1986, he served as President of the United Nations Security Council.

== Early life and family ==
Rabetafika was born on 3 February 1932 in Antananarivo, in what was then French Madagascar. The second of Albert Joseph Rabetafika, a teacher, and Ramboahangimalala Hélène, a weaver, he had an older brother, Roland. His father's family were Protestant. His paternal grandfather, Joseph Rabetafika, was a minister, and his great-grandfather, Josefa Andrianaivoravelona, was the pastor of Queen Ranavalona III, and accompanied her in exile to Réunion. On his mother's side, he is the grandson of René Rahoërson, the first Malagasy physician at the Institut Pasteur of Madagascar. While they were not a wealthy family, Rabetafika's parents raised their children with the values of discipline, honesty, and a Protestant sense of austerity.

=== Education ===
Rabetafika completed his secondary education at the Lycée Galliéni, graduating in 1950 at 18. He then went on to study at the University of Toulouse in Toulouse, France. There, he earned a Licentiate in Classics in 1953, followed by a Diploma of Higher Studies in English Literature in 1955 and a CAPES degree in 1956. At some point, he also studied in England.

== Career ==
=== Early career ===
After graduating from the University of Toulouse, Rabetafika taught in England and France before returning to Madagascar. In 1960, at age 28, he became the youngest member of the Malagasy delegation that negotiated Madagascar's independence from France.

=== Diplomatic career ===
From 1960 to 1963, he was the advisor for cultural affairs at the Madagascar delegation in France. From 1961 to 1963, he was the Permanent Delegate of Madagascar to UNESCO in Paris, before briefly serving as Technical Advisor for East African Affairs to the President of Madagascar in 1963. FRom 1963 to 1969, he was a member delegate to the United Nations General Assembly. From 1964 to 1967, he was the Chief of Staff of the Minister of Foreign Affairs.

In 1967, Rabetafika entered the diplomatic service. He served as Deputy Permanent Representative of Madagascar to the United Nations, before serving as Consul General in New York in 1968. From 1968 to 1969, he was acting Permanent Representative to the UN. The next year, he was appointed Permanent Representative of Madagascar to the United Nations. He presented his credentials to UN Secretary-General U Thant on 26 September 1969. He served concurrently as the Malagasy Ambassador to Canada and the Ambassador to Cuba, beginning in 1970 and 1974, respectively. As a diplomat, he was widely respected, often solicited for advice, and nicknamed "the Big Brother" by his colleagues. He was noted by some to have been considered as a successor to Javier Pérez de Cuéllar or Boutros Boutros-Ghali as Secretary-General of the United Nations, but this never came to fruition. In 1973, he was Vice Chairman of the United Nations Political Committee. From 1973 to 1974 he was Vice President of the United Nations United Nations Economic and Social Committee.

In March 1985 and again in June 1986, Rabetafika served as President of the United Nations Security Council. He was, to this day, the only representative of Madagascar to serve in the position. In 1990, he lobbied successfully for the election of Raymond Ranjeva as judge on the International Court of Justice, making him the first and only Malagasy justice ever to serve on the court. Rabetafika stepped down as ambassador to Canada in 1989. In June 1992, he retired, leaving his positions as ambassador to Cuba and Permanent Representative to the UN.

== Death ==
Rabetafika died on 17 December 2000 in Antananarivo, aged 68.

== Personal life ==
Rabetafika married Jeanne Razafintsalama (or Rasoazanantsalama) in 1955 or 1956. Together, they had a son and two daughters. Rabetafika was the cousin of Malagasy diplomat Zina Andrianarivelo-Razafy and jazz musician Serge Rahoërson. He played the violin and enjoyed jazz and classical music.

== Awards and honors ==
Rabetafika has been awarded honors from countries including France, Germany, Japan, China, Liberia, Malawi, Senegal, Ethiopia, and the Philippines. He was a member of the International Association of Permanent Representatives to the United Nations, and served on its board of directors beginning in 1990. Other awards and honors include:

- Mercure d'or international, 1985
- Grand Knight, National Order of the Republic of Madagascar
