= Shanga =

Shanga may refer to:

- Shanga (singer), Nigerian-Swiss singer and songwriter
- Shanga, Pate Island, an archeological site in Kenya on Pate Island
- Shanga, Nigeria, a local government area in Kebbi State
