= List of ambassadors of Italy to Argentina =

Coordinates: 34.566210°S 58.445958°W

Ambassador of Italy to Argentina
- Emblem of Italy
- Inaugural holder: Marcello Cerruti
- Formation: May 5, 1856

The Italian ambassador in Buenos Aires is the official representative of the Government in Rome to the Government of Argentina.

== List of representatives ==
Diplomatic accreditation	Ambassador	Observations	List of prime ministers of Italy	List of heads of state of Argentina	Term end
May 5, 1856	Marcello Cerruti	Chargé d'affaires	Camillo Benso, Count of Cavour	Justo José de Urquiza	1861
December 13, 1861	Raffaele Ulisse Barbolani	Chargé d'affaires	Bettino Ricasoli	Juan Esteban Pedernera	1864
February 4, 1864	Raffaele Ulisse Barbolani		Alfonso Ferrero La Marmora	Bartolomé Mitre	1867
March 16, 1867	Luigi Joannini Ceva di San Michele	Chargé d'affaires	Urbano Rattazzi	Bartolomé Mitre	1868
August 8, 1868	Enrico della Croce di Dojola		Urbano Rattazzi	Domingo Faustino Sarmiento	1876
February 18, 1876	Federico Costanzo Spinola		Agostino Depretis	Nicolás Avellaneda	1880
May 30, 1880	Saverio Fava		Benedetto Cairoli	Julio Argentino Roca	1881
August 28, 1881	Enrico Cova		Agostino Depretis	Julio Argentino Roca	1888
February 5, 1888	Giuseppe Anfora di Licignano		Francesco Crispi	Miguel Juárez Celman	1894
November 29, 1894	Pietro Antonelli		Francesco Crispi	Luis Sáenz Peña	1898
February 20, 1898	Principe di Carlati Lorenzo Friozzi (1858 - 1906)	Chargé d'affaires	Luigi Pelloux	Julio Argentino Roca	1898
March 24, 1898	Obizzo Malaspina di Carbonara		Luigi Pelloux	Julio Argentino Roca	1901
April 18, 1901	Francesco Bottaro-Costa		Giuseppe Zanardelli	Julio Argentino Roca	1906
October 21, 1906	Vincenzo Macchi di Cellere		Sidney Sonnino	José Figueroa Alcorta	1912
October 3, 1912	Vittore Cobianchi		Giovanni Giolitti	Roque Sáenz Peña	1921
October 6, 1921	Giuseppe Colli di Felizzano		Ivanoe Bonomi	Hipólito Yrigoyen	1923
December 6, 1923	Luigi Aldrovandi Marescotti		Benito Mussolini	Marcelo Torcuato de Alvear	1924
July 3, 1924	Luigi Aldrovandi Marescotti	ambassador	Benito Mussolini	Marcelo Torcuato de Alvear	1926
May 16, 1926	Alberto Martin-Franklin		Benito Mussolini	Marcelo Torcuato de Alvear	1929
November 14, 1929	Bonifacio Pignatti Morano di Custoza		Benito Mussolini	Hipólito Yrigoyen	1932
August 25, 1932	Mario Arlotta		Benito Mussolini	Agustín Pedro Justo	1936
August 7, 1936	Raffaele Guariglia		Benito Mussolini	Agustín Pedro Justo	1939
February 26, 1939	Gabriele Preziosi		Benito Mussolini	Roberto María Ortiz	1940
August 21, 1940	Raffaele Boscarelli		Benito Mussolini	Roberto María Ortiz	1942
April 23, 1942	Livio Garbaccio	Chargé d'affaires	Benito Mussolini	Ramón Castillo	1942
May 12, 1942	Francesco Pittalis	(*July 15, 1906 ): From 1932 to 1942 he was cónsul géneral of Italy in Munich.	Benito Mussolini	Ramón Castillo	1944
November 21, 1944	Federico Sensi	Chargé d'affaires, From 3 December 1964 to 8 August 1968 he was Italy's ambassador to Moscow (Soviet Union) Italian ambassador to Russia.	Pietro Badoglio	Edelmiro Julián Farrell	1946
January 5, 1946	Giovanni Fornari	Chargé d'affaires	Ferruccio Parri	Juan Perón	1946
December 28, 1946	Giustino Arpesani	Giustino Arpesani (1896–1980), a lawyer, Italian politician, and diplomat, was a member of the Liberal Partyfrom 1921 to 1947, when he left the party.	Ferruccio Parri	Juan Perón	1951
March 14, 1951	Alberigo Casardi	Chargé d'affaires	Ferruccio Parri	Juan Perón	1955
April 27, 1955	Francesco Babuscio Rizzo		Antonio Segni	Eduardo Lonardi	1960
July 8, 1960	Francesco Babuscio Rizzo		Fernando Tambroni	Arturo Frondizi	1962
April 30, 1962	Lanza d'Ajeta di Trabia		Fernando Tambroni	José María Guido	1964
December 22, 1964	Alessandro Tassoni Estense di Castelvecchio		Giovanni Leone	Arturo Umberto Illia	1967
September 23, 1967	Paolo Tallarigo di Zagarise e Sersale		Giovanni Leone	Juan Carlos Onganía	1971
December 4, 1971	Giuseppe De Rege Thesauro		Emilio Colombo	Alejandro Agustín Lanusse	1976
April 23, 1976	Enrico Carrara		Giulio Andreotti	Jorge Rafael Videla	1979
May 4, 1979	Umberto Bozzini		Francesco Cossiga	Jorge Rafael Videla	1979
September 4, 1979	Umberto Bozzini		Francesco Cossiga	Jorge Rafael Videla	1982
March 2, 1982	Sergio Kociancich		Amintore Fanfani	Alfredo Saint Jean	1985
February 23, 1985	Ludovico Incisa di Camerana		Bettino Craxi	Raúl Alfonsín	1987
August 7, 1987	Ludovico Incisa di Camerana		Amintore Fanfani	Raúl Alfonsín	1991
December 10, 1991	Cláudio Moreno		Giulio Andreotti	Carlos Menem	1993
June 8, 1993	Giuseppe Maria Borga		Carlo Azeglio Ciampi	Carlos Menem	1998
July 11, 1998	Giovanni Jannuzzi		Massimo D’Alema	Carlos Menem	2001
November 5, 2001	Roberto Nigido		Silvio Berlusconi	Ramón Puerta	2005
October 31, 2005	Stefano Ronca		Silvio Berlusconi	Néstor Kirchner	2009
December 28, 2009	Guido Walter La Tella		Silvio Berlusconi	Cristina Fernández de Kirchner	2013
January 2, 2013	Guido Walter La Tella		Enrico Letta	Cristina Fernández de Kirchner	2013
September 12, 2013	Teresa Castaldo		Enrico Letta	Cristina Fernández de Kirchner	2015
January 2, 2015	Teresa Castaldo		Matteo Renzi	Cristina Fernández de Kirchner	2018
February 12, 2018	Giuseppe Manzo		Giuseppe Conte	Mauricio Macri	2021
