= Lytton Report =

Findings on Japanese invasion of Manchuria

- Cover of the Lytton Report
- Presented: 1932
- Date effective: c. August–September 1945
- Commissioned by: League of Nations (upon appeal by the Republic of China)
- Author: Victor Bulwer-Lytton, 2nd Earl of Lytton
- Subject: Japanese invasion of Manchuria

Full text
- Report of the Commission of Enquiry at Wikisource

The Report of the Commission of Enquiry, commonly referred to as the Lytton Report (リットン報告書, Ritton Hōkokusho) refers to the findings of the Lytton Commission, entrusted in 1931 by the League of Nations in an attempt to evaluate the Mukden Incident, which was used to justify the Empire of Japan's seizure of Manchuria.

The five-member commission, headed by British politician the Earl of Lytton, announced its conclusions in October 1932. It stated that the Empire of Japan must withdraw from Manchuria, recognized Chinese sovereignty of Manchuria, and refused to recognize the Japanese puppet state of Manchukuo. The League of Nations General Assembly adopted the report, and Japan quit the League. The recommendations went into effect after Japan surrendered in World War II in 1945.

== Commission ==
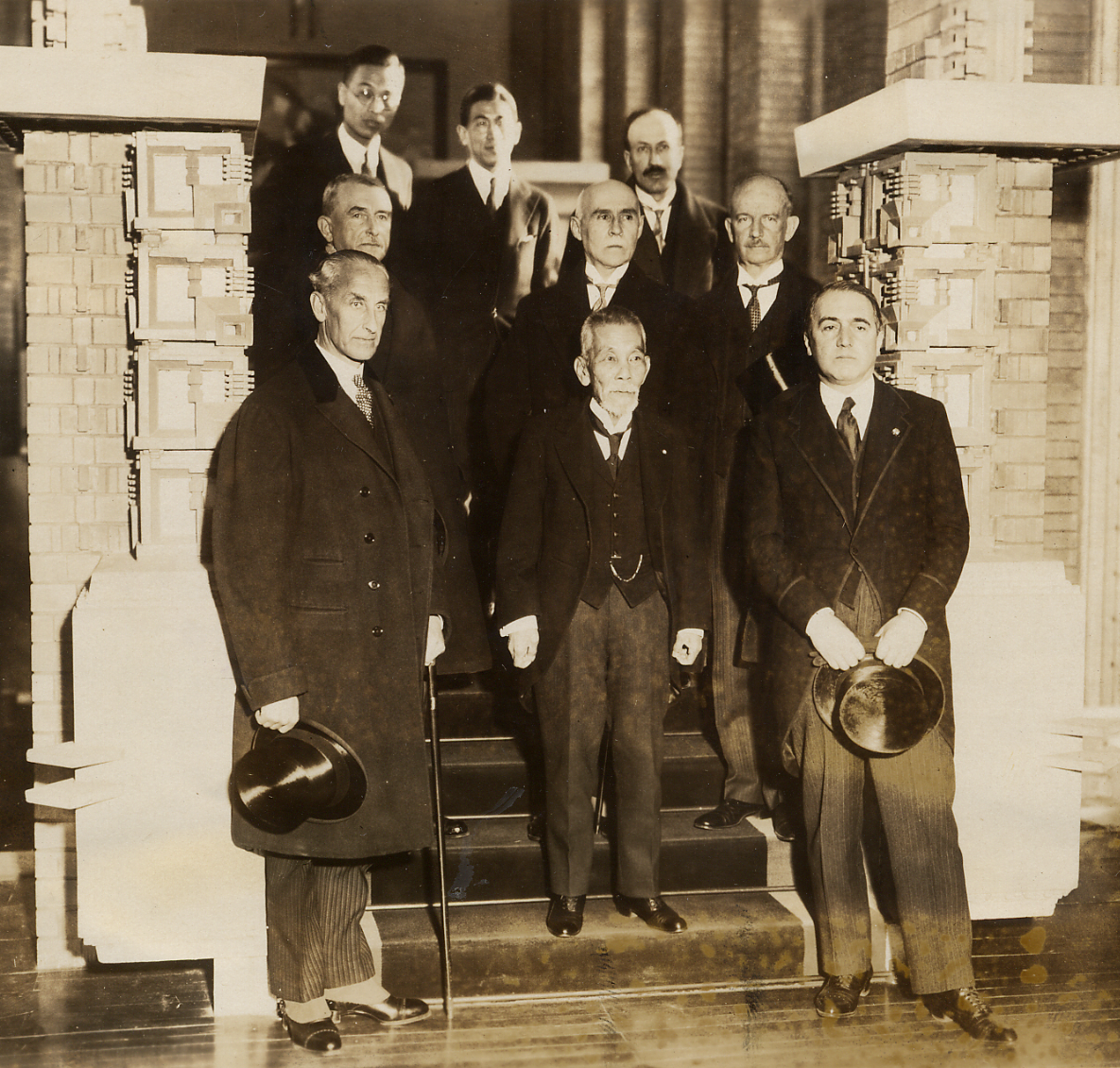
Lytton Commission members visits Japanese Prime Minister Inukai Tsuyoshi in Tokyo on February 29, 1932

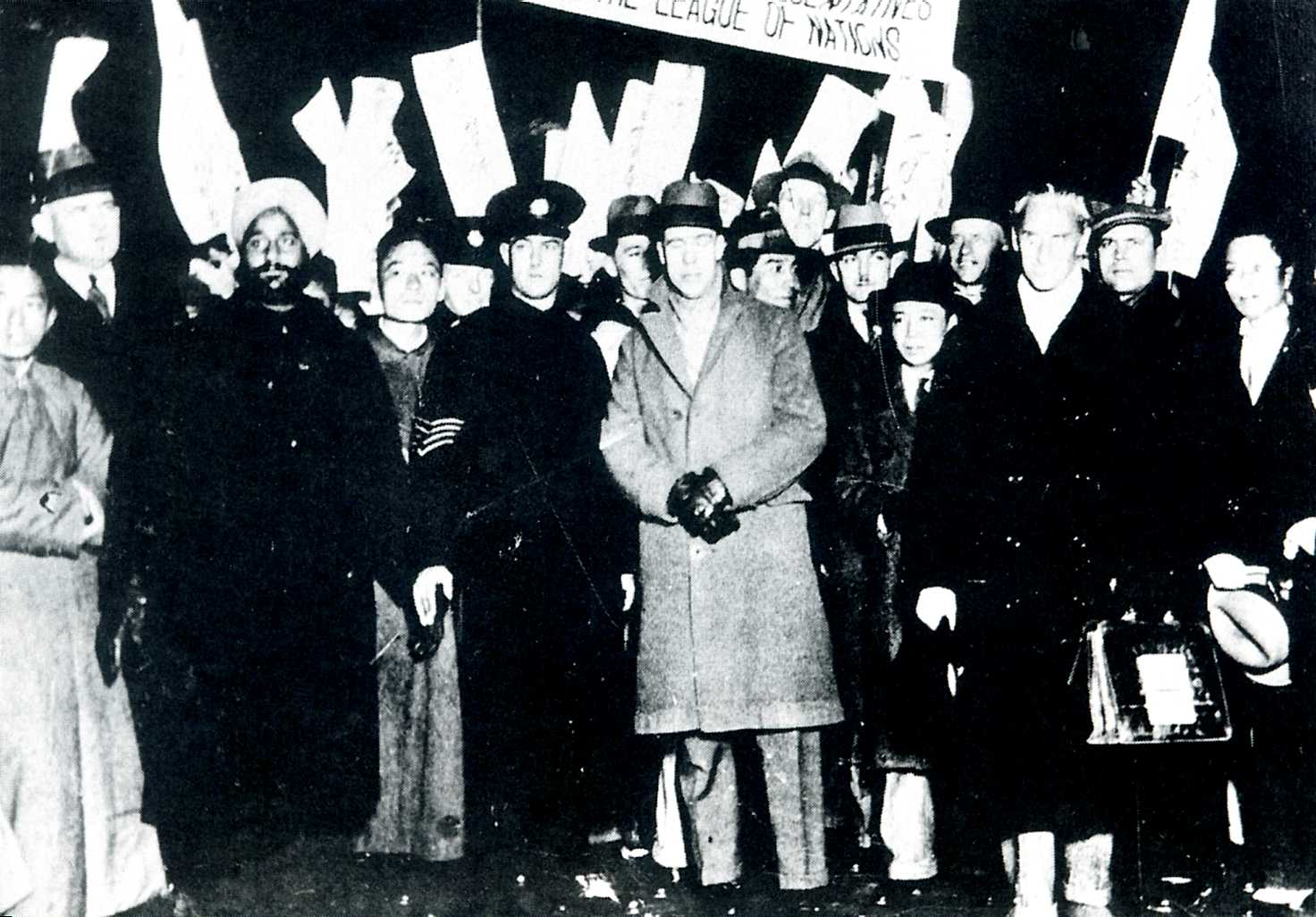
Lytton Commission members in Shanghai (Lord Lytton wearing a coat in center of photo)

The Lytton Commission, headed by Lord Lytton, included four other members, one each from the United States (Major-General Frank Ross McCoy), Germany (Dr Heinrich Schnee), Italy (Count Luigi Aldrovandi Marescotti), and France (General Henri Claudel).

=== 1932 Manchuria visits ===
Lytton Commission, investigating the blast point of the railway.

The group spent six weeks in Manchuria in spring 1932 (despite having been sent in December 1931) on a fact-finding mission after they had met government leaders in the Republic of China and in Japan.

There were also members of the commission in September 1932. At the time, Manchuria was plagued by a series of train attacks, many of which sabotaged the railways with explosions. The bandits were planning an attack on the express train transporting the German governor Heinrich Schnee and French general Henri Claudel, representative of the Lytton Commission during their voyage back to Europe. They planned to kidnap them and then demand ransom. Airplanes were used during their journey as a safety measure to prevent it.

== Lytton Report ==
It was hoped that the report would defuse the hostilities between Japan and China and thus help maintain peace and stability in the Far East.

The Lytton Report contained an account of the situation in Manchuria before September 1931, when the Mukden Incident took place as the Japanese army (without authorization from the Japanese government) seized the large Chinese province of Manchuria. The Report described the unsatisfactory features of the Chinese administration and giving weight to the various claims and complaints of Japan. It then proceeded with a narrative of the events in Manchuria subsequent to September 18, 1931, based on the evidence of many participants and on that of eyewitnesses. It devoted particular attention to the origins and development of the State of Manchukuo, which had already been proclaimed by the time the Commission reached Manchuria. It also covered the question of the economic interests of Japan both in Manchuria and China as a whole, and the nature and effects of the Chinese anti-Japanese boycott. Soviet Union interests in the region were also mentioned. Finally, the Commission submitted a study of the conditions to which, in its judgment, any satisfactory solution should conform, and made various proposals and suggestions as to how an agreement embodying these principles might be brought about.

However, the report did not directly address one of its chief goals: the cause of the Mukden Incident. Instead, it simply stated the Japanese position (that the Chinese had been responsible), with no comment as to the truth or falsity of the Japanese claims. Although there was no doubt as to Japan's guilt among the five commission members, Claudel (the French delegate) insisted that Japan not be portrayed as the aggressor.

In spite of care to preserve impartiality between the conflicting views of China and Japan, the effect of the Report was regarded as a substantial vindication of the Chinese case on most fundamental issues. In particular, the Commission stated that the operations of the Imperial Japanese Army following on the Mukden incident could not be regarded as legitimate self-defence. Regarding Manchukuo, the Report concluded that the new State could not have been formed without the presence of Japanese troops; that it had no general support locally or from China; and that it was not part of a genuine and spontaneous independent movement. Still, the report held that both China and Japan had legitimate grievances. Japan, it states, took advantage of questionable rights, and China obstructed by the exercise of her undoubted rights. The Geneva correspondent of The Daily Telegraph says: "The report, which was approved unanimously, proposes that China and Japan shall be given three months in which to accept or reject the recommendations. It is hoped that the parties will agree to direct negotiations."

The Daily Telegraph French correspondent says: "The report insists on the withdrawal of Japanese troops within the South Manchuria railway zone, and recommends the establishment of an organisation under the sovereignty of China to deal with conditions in Manchuria, taking due account of the rights and interests of Japan, and the formation of a committee of negotiation for the application of these and other recommendations."

== Consequences ==
In September 1932, even before the official announcement of the findings of the Lytton Report on October 2, 1932, was made public, the Japanese government extended official diplomatic recognition to the puppet government of Manchukuo. When the findings of the Report were announced before the General Assembly of the League of Nations, recognizing Chinese sovereignty over Manchuria and refusing to recognize Manchukuo, the Japanese delegation led by ambassador Yosuke Matsuoka walked out. Japan gave formal notice of its withdrawal from the League of Nations on March 27, 1933. The United States announced the Stimson Doctrine, which warned Japan that areas gained by conquest would not be recognized.

In the end, the Lytton Report showcased the weaknesses of the League of Nations and its inability to enforce its decisions. The situation was complicated by the length of time it took for the Lytton Commission to prepare its report, during which time Japan was able to firmly secure its control over Manchuria and was thus able to reject the condemnation of the League with impunity.

Despite insistence by the small powers of the League of Nations, the great powers never invoked Article 16 of the Covenant, to mark the Empire of Japan as an aggressor and levy economic sanctions. Amid the Great Depression, the great powers were reluctant to further damage their own economies by sanctioning another great power, and the policy used was largely appeasement. Without Article 16, it was impossible for the League to enforce the Lytton Report.
