= Luigi Aldrovandi Marescotti =

Italian politician and diplomat

- Luigi Aldrovandi Marescotti (centre), 1935

Italian ambassador to Bulgaria
- In office 14 September 1920 – 22 February 1923
- Preceded by: Fausto Cucchi Boasso
- Succeeded by: Sabino Rinella

Italian ambassador to Argentina
- In office 6 December 1923 – 16 May 1926
- Preceded by: Giuseppe Colli di Felizzano
- Succeeded by: Alberto Martin-Franklin

Italian ambassador to Germany
- In office 23 February 1926 – 14 November 1929
- Preceded by: Alessandro De Bosdari
- Succeeded by: Luca Orsini Baroni

Personal details
- Born: 5 October 1876; Bologna
- Died: 9 July 1945 (aged 68); Rome

Luigi Aldrovandi Marescotti, Count of Viano, LLD, (5 October 1876 – 9 July 1945) was an Italian politician and diplomat. He was educated at the University of Bologna.

== Biography ==
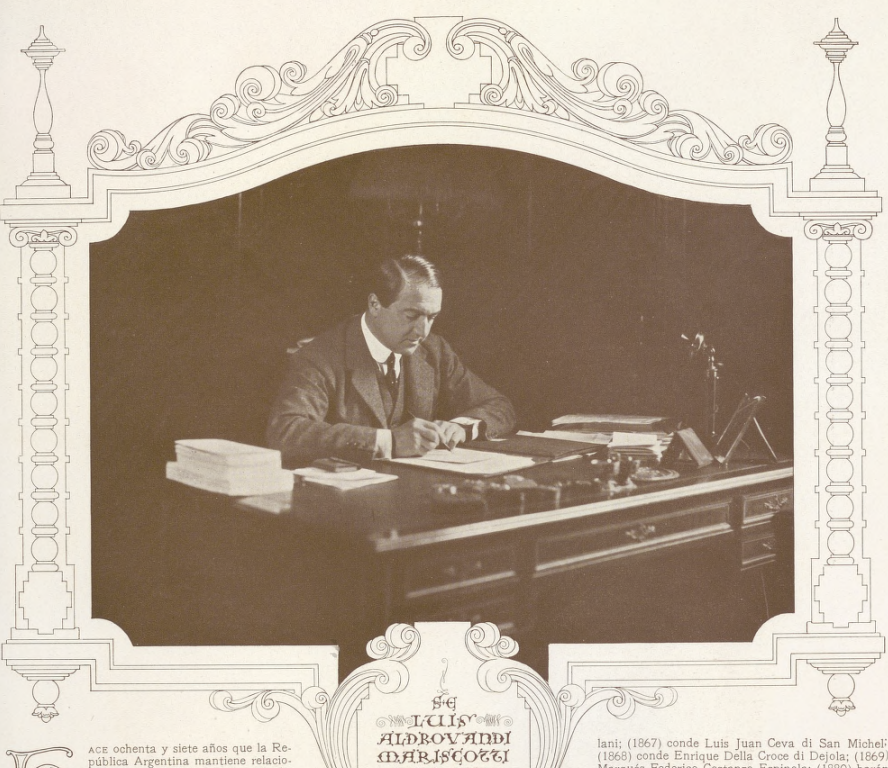
Luigi Aldrovandi Marescotti as the Italian ambassador in Argentina, in 1924

He graduated in Law in 1897 from the University of Bologna and entered the consular career, following a competition, in 1900. Marescotti was an associate of Prime Minister Sidney Sonnino and was appointed to the Paris Conference. He was Envoy Extraordinary and Minister Plenipotentiary in The Hague (February 1920), Sofia (1920 - 1923) and Cairo (March 1923). From November 1923 he was Ambassador to Buenos Aires and from March 1926 to December 1929 to Berlin.

In 1939 he was appointed Senator of the Kingdom of Italy. He resigned as Senator on 21 October 1944 following the order of the High Court of Justice for sanctions against fascism.

He wrote two autobiographical books, containing various portions of a diary, covering the First World War and its peace treaty seen by him as a spectator of many conferences and talks.

== Works ==
- Guerra diplomatica. Ricordi e frammenti di un diario (1914-1919) (1936)
- Nuovi ricordi e frammenti di diario (1938)

== Honors ==
Grand cordon of the Order of Saints Maurice and Lazarus

Knight Grand Cross of the Order of the Crown of Italy

== See also ==
- Lytton Report
