= List of ambassadors of Italy to the Ottoman Empire =

Ambassador of Italy to the Ottoman Empire
- Emblem of Italy
- Status: Finished since 1924
- Inaugural holder: Giacomo Durando
- Formation: May 5, 1856

The Ambassador of Italy to the Ottoman Empire (in Turkish, İtalya'nın Osmanlı İmparatorluğu Büyükelçisi) was the head of the diplomatic mission of the Kingdom of Italy in the Ottoman Empire.

== List ==
The following is a list of Italian ambassadors in the Ottoman Empire.

| Appointment | Title | Diplomatic mission | Headquarters | Appointed by the government | Accreditation |
|---|---|---|---|---|---|
Ottoman Empire
| 25 September 1856 | Inv. Str. and plenipotentiary | Giacomo Durando | Costantinopoli | Vittorio Emanuele II | Abdülmecid I |
| 13 July 1861 | Inv. Str. and plenipotentiary | Marcello Cerruti | Costantinople | Ricasoli I | Abdulaziz |
| 26 June 1862 | Inv. Str. and plenipotentiary | Camillo Caracciolo Di Bella | Costantinople | Rattazzi I | Abdulaziz |
| 27 August 1863 | Inv. Str. and plenipotentiary | Giuseppe Greppi | Costantinople | Minghetti I | Abdulaziz |
| 18 March 1866 | Inv. Str. and plenipotentiary | Emilio Visconti Venosta | Costantinople | La Marmora III | Abdulaziz |
| 2 May 1867 | Inv. Str. and plenipotentiary | Giuseppe Bertinatti | Costantinople | Rattazzi II | Abdulaziz |
| 24 May 1869 | Inv. Str. and plenipotentiary | Raffaele Ulisse Barbolani | Costantinople | Menabrea III | Abdulaziz |
| 17 July 1875 | Inv. Str. and plenipotentiary | Luigi Corti | Costantinople | Minghetti II | Abdulaziz |
| 11 February 1886 | Inv. Str. and plenipotentiary | Francesco Galvagna | Costantinople | Depretis VII | Murad V |
| 3 February1887 | Ambassador | Alberto Blanc | Costantinople | Depretis VII | Murad V |
| 2 October 1891 | Ambassador | Costantino Ressman | Costantinople | Rudinì I | Murad V |
| 3 May 1892 | Ambassador | Luigi Avogadro di Collobiano Arborio | Costantinople | Rudinì I | Murad V |
| 1894 | Ambassador | Tommaso Catalini | Costantinople | Crispi IV | Murad V |
| 24 October 1895 | Ambassador | Alberto Pansa | Costantinople | Crispi IV | Murad V |
| 1 March 1896 | Chargé d'affaires | Alberto De Foresta | Costantinople | Crispi IV | Murad V |
| 1903 | Ambassador | Obizzo Malaspina di Carbonara | Costantinople | Giolitti II | Murad V |
| January 1904 | Ambassador | Guglielmo Imperiali di Francavilla | Costantinople | Giolitti II | Murad V |
| 1910 | Ambassador | Edmondo Mayor des Planches | Costantinople | Luzzatti | Mehmet V |
| 21 July 1911 | Ambassador | Camillo Garroni Carbonara | Costantinople | Giolitti IV | Mehmet V |

=== Italian High Commissioner to the Ottoman Empire ===
At the end of the First World War, as decreed by the armistice of Mudros, the Ottoman Empire was dismembered and the capital Constantinople occupied by the allied powers.

| Appointment | Title | Diplomatic mission | Headquarters | Appointed by the government | Accreditation |
|---|---|---|---|---|---|
Occupation of Constantinople
| November 1918 | High Commissioner Allied | Carlo Sforza | Costantinople | Orlando | Mustafa Kemal Atatürk |
| January 1919 | High Commissioner Allied | Romano Lodi Fé | Costantinople | Nitti I | Mustafa Kemal Atatürk |
| September 1920 | High Commissioner Allied | Camillo Garroni Carbonara | Costantinople | Giolitti V | Mustafa Kemal Atatürk |
