= Joy-Ann Skinner =

Barbadian diplomat

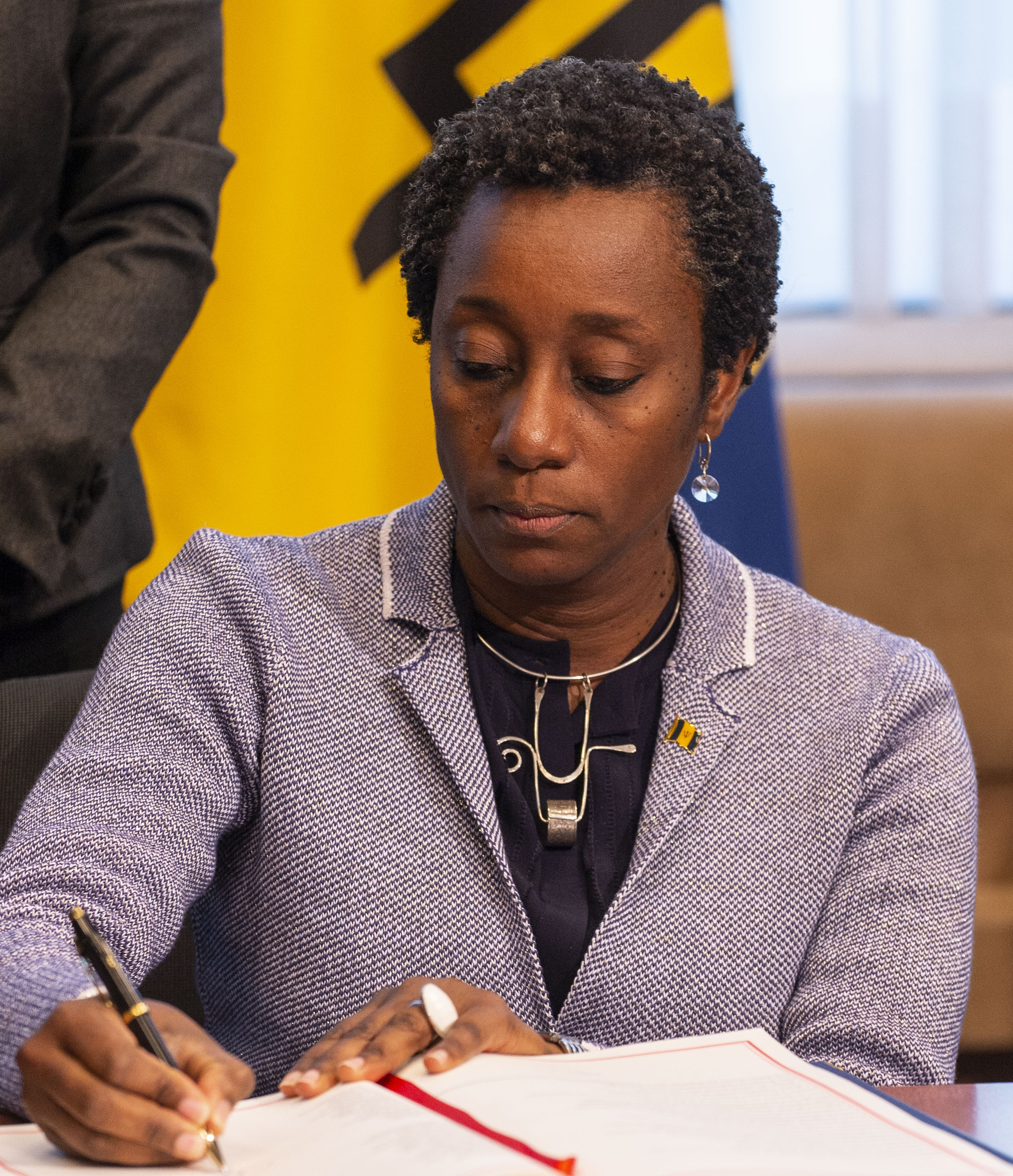
Joy-Ann Skinner in April 2018.

Joy-Ann Skinner is the Ambassador Extraordinary and Plenipotentiary of Barbados to the European Union, Belgium, and France. On March 29, 2019, and she presented her credentials as ambassador to Luxembourg.

Skinner earned a BSc in Political Science from the University of the West Indies and a post graduate diploma in International Relations.
