= Luigi Corti =

Italian diplomat and politician (1823–1888)

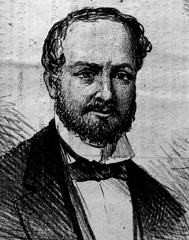
- Luigi Corti

Personal details
- Born: 24 October 1823 Gambarana
- Died: 18 February 1888 (aged 64) Roma
- Education: University of Pavia

Count Luigi Corti (24 October 1823 – 19 February 1888), Italian diplomat, was born at Gambarana in the Kingdom of Lombardy–Venetia (present-day Province of Pavia). represented Italy at the Congress of Berlin in 1878 together with Edoardo de Launay.

== Biography ==
Luigi Corti belonged to a noble and ancient Piedmontese family. Early involved with Benedetto Cairoli in anti-Austrian conspiracies, he was exiled to Turin, where he entered the Piedmontese foreign office. After serving as artillery officer through the campaign of 1848, he was in 1850 appointed secretary of legation in London. He held this post until 6 April 1864, when he was appointed resident minister to the King of Sweden and Norway. Three years later, in 1867, he was promoted envoy extraordinary and minister plenipotentiary, and went in this capacity to Madrid, where he successfully concluded a treaty with the Queen of Spain for the reciprocal extradition of criminals between the two kingdoms. In 1870 he was transferred to Washington in the same capacity, and during the six years he resided in the United States he did much to render the already amicable relations that existed between Italy and that country closer and more cordial. In recognition of his eminent services, in 1875 he was appointed ambassador to Constantinople, representing Italy at the 1876 Constantinople Conference.

Called by Cairoli to the direction of foreign affairs in 1878, he represented the Kingdom of Italy in the Congress of Berlin, but unwisely declined Lord Derby's offer for an Anglo-Italian agreement in defence of common interests. At Berlin, he sustained the cause of Greek independence, but in all other respects remained isolated, and excited the wrath of his countrymen by returning to Italy with empty hands.

For a time he withdrew from public life, but in 1881 was again sent to Constantinople by Cairoli, where he presided over the futile conference of ambassadors upon the Egyptian question. In 1886, he was transferred to the London embassy but was recalled by Crispi in the following year after a misunderstanding.

== Honours ==
Grand cordon of the Order of Saints Maurice and Lazarus

Knight Grand Cross of the Order of the Crown of Italy

== See also ==
- Ministry of Foreign Affairs (Italy)
- Foreign relations of Italy

== Bibliography ==
- Clemente, Vincenzo (1983). "CORTI, Luigi". Dizionario Biografico degli Italiani (in Italian). Vol. 29: Cordier–Corvo. Rome: Institute of the Italian Encyclopaedia. ISBN 978-88-12-00032-6.

Preceded by Filippo di Bella Caracciolo	Ambassador of Italy to Spain; 1867–1869	Succeeded by Marcello Cerruti
Preceded by Marcello Cerruti	Italian ambassador to the United States; 1870–1875	Succeeded by Alberto Blanc
Preceded by Raffaele Ulisse Barbolani	Italian ambassador to the Ottoman Empire; 1870–1875	Succeeded by Francesco Galvagna
Preceded by Costantino Nigra	Italian ambassador to the United Kingdom; 1886–1888	Succeeded by Carlo Felice di Robilant
