= Pierrot Rajaonarivelo =

Malagasy politician and diplomat

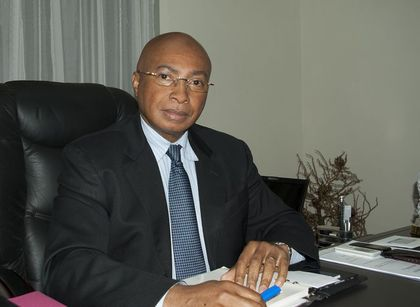

Malagasy Ambassador to the United States
- In office 20 December 1989 – 1997
- Prime Minister: Victor Ramahatra
- Preceded by: Leon Rajaobelina
- Succeeded by: Zina Andrianarivelo-Razafy

Personal details
- Born: 17 June 1946 (age 79) Île Sainte-Marie, Madagascar
- Party: AREMA

Pierrot Jocelyn Rajaonarivelo (born 17 June 1946) is a Malagasy politician who served in the government of Madagascar as Minister of Foreign Affairs from 2011 to 2013. He previously served as Deputy Prime Minister from 1997 to 2002, under President Didier Ratsiraka, and he was also National Secretary of the AREMA party at that time. He went into exile when Ratsiraka was ousted in 2002, and he was subsequently convicted of abuse of office in absentia. He was seen by many as the main potential challenger to President Marc Ravalomanana in the December 2006 presidential election; however, he was barred from standing.

== Life and career ==
Rajaonarivelo was born on the island of Sainte-Marie, Analanjirofo Region. He served as Madagascar's Ambassador to the United States from 20 December 1989 to 1997. Following the election of Ratsiraka as president, he became Deputy Prime Minister in charge of the Budget and Decentralization in the government named on 27 February 1997. He was also elected as National Secretary of AREMA on 29 November 1997 at a national congress of the party.

Following the December 2001 presidential election, a dispute arose between Ratsiraka and Ravalomanana regarding the results; after months of struggle, this dispute led to defeat for Ratsiraka and his supporters. A few days before Ratsiraka fled Madagascar in early July 2002, with the situation having turned clearly in Ravalomanana's favor, Rajaonarivelo announced his willingness to work with Ravalomanana. Like Ratsiraka, however, Rajaonarivelo went into exile in France when Ravalomanana prevailed.

In a meeting with representatives of the African Union on 29 October 2002, Ravalomanana said that he was prepared to form a national unity government that would include members of AREMA, and he said that consultations with Rajaonarivelo regarding AREMA's participation would follow. AU representatives subsequently met with Rajaonarivelo in Pretoria on 22 November 2002; at that meeting, Rajaonarivelo stated again that AREMA recognized Ravalomanana's election as president, and he said that AREMA was prepared to work with Ravalomanana for the sake of national reconciliation and stability. He also said that AREMA was willing to participate in a planned parliamentary election, as long as the election was free, fair, and transparent, although he proposed that the election be delayed to ensure that it would occur under the proper conditions. He complained that members of AREMA were being harassed, intimidated, and arrested. Although the AU agreed with Rajaonarivelo's position on a delay, the election was nevertheless held as planned in December 2002.

While in exile, Rajaonarivelo was sentenced to five years in prison on 14 March 2003 for abuse of office; he was subsequently convicted on charges of misuse of funds in August 2006 and sentenced to 15 years of hard labor, as well as barred from holding public office. Rajaonarivelo faced arrest upon return to Madagascar; he argued that the charges against him were politically motivated.

In spite of the convictions and sentences, Rajaonarivelo sought to run for president in 2006; he officially announced his candidacy on 26 May 2006. On 7 October 2006, he attempted to return to Madagascar from nearby Réunion to register as a presidential candidate before the 14 October deadline, although his spokesman said he was afraid of being met by a "death squad" upon arrival; the airport at Toamasina was closed to prevent his arrival, however. He then went to Mauritius and tried again to return to Madagascar on 12 October, but he was not allowed to board a flight by Air Mauritius, being described as a security risk; this measure had been requested by the government in Madagascar. Because he could not reach Madagascar, he could not sign his registration papers personally, and on 18 October he was barred from participating in the election by the Constitutional Court for that reason. Rajaonarivelo said that "by preventing my participation Marc Ravalomanana's regime invalidates the election", and he accused the international community of supporting "tyrannical practices" with "complicit silence".

President Ravalomanana was forced out of office by popular protests and military intervention in March 2009; the leader of the protests, Andry Rajoelina, assumed the presidency. When he was sworn in as president on 21 March 2009, Rajoelina said that he would pardon political prisoners and exiles; Rajaonarivelo then returned to Madagascar on 25 April 2009. Prime Minister Monja Roindefo had requested on 23 April that political exiles not return for the time being, but Rajaonarivelo, citing Rajoelina's inauguration statement, returned anyway.
