= Teresa Castaldo =

Italian diplomat

Personal details
- Occupation: Diplomat

Teresa Castaldo has been the Italian Ambassador to France since January 25, 2018 and was Ambassador to Argentina from September 13, 2013 until January 24, 2018.

== See also ==
- Ministry of Foreign Affairs (Italy)
- Foreign relations of Italy
