= Alberto Blanc =

Italian diplomat and politician (1835–1904)

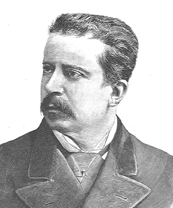
Alberto Blanc

Alberto Blanc (10 November 1835, Chambéry – 31 May 1904) was an Italian diplomat and politician. He was minister of foreign affairs of the Kingdom of Italy from 1893 to 1896. He was ambassador to Italy to the Ottoman Empire from 1886 to 1891, the United States from 1875 to 1880, and Spain from 1870 to 1871 and then again from 1883 to 1887. He was a recipient of the Order of Saints Maurice and Lazarus.

== Biography ==
Son of Louis François Blanc and Mariette Cartannas, he married Natalia (Natividad) Terry, an Irish-Cuban sugar heiress. By royal decree of 30 March 1873, he was granted the title of Baron.

He graduated in Law at the University of Turin in 1857. From 1857 to 1860 he worked as a publicist.

The Count of Cavour sent him on a special mission to Paris on 2 February 1860. Hi appointment of secretary of second class at the Ministry of Foreign Affairs on 24 October 1860 marked the beginning a brilliant diplomatic career.

In 1893 he bought a vineyard in Rome, in Via Nomentana, and had its buildings renovated, thus creating what became Villa Blanc, one of the most beautiful villas in Rome, now located in the Municipality of Rome II.

== Works ==
- Alberto Blanc, Collana Testi diplomatici vol. 4, Ministero degli Affari Esteri - Servizio Storico e Documentazione - Roma (PDF version)

== Honors ==
Grand cordon of the Order of Saints Maurice and Lazarus – 2 October 1891

Knight Grand Cross of the Order of the Crown of Italy

== See also ==
- Ministry of Foreign Affairs (Italy)
- Foreign relations of Italy

Preceded by Raffaele Ulisse Barbolani	Secretary General of the Ministry of Foreign Affairs; 1869–1870	Succeeded by Isacco Artom
Preceded by Marcello Cerruti	Ambassador of Italy to Spain; 1870–1871	Succeeded by Giulio Camillo De Barral de Monteauvrand
Preceded by Lodovico, Count Corti	Ambassador of Italy to the United States; 1875–1880	Succeeded by Francesco Saverio Fava
Preceded by Carlo Alberto Ferdinando Maffei di Boglio	Secretary General of the Ministry of Foreign Affairs; 1881–1883	Succeeded by Giacomo Malvano
Preceded by Giuseppe Greppi	Ambassador of Italy to Spain; 1883-1887	Succeeded by Carlo Alberto Ferdinando Maffei di Boglio
Preceded by Francesco Galvagna	Ambassador of Italy to the Ottoman Empire; 1886–1891	Succeeded by Constantino Ressmann
Preceded by Benedetto Brin	Minister of Foreign Affairs of the Kingdom of Italy; 1893–1896	Succeeded by Onorato Caetani
