= Modupe Irele =

Nigerian diplomat

Modupe E. Irele

17th Nigeria Ambassador to France
- In office 18 December 2017 – 2021
- President: Muhammadu Buhari

Personal details
- Born: Modupe Enitan Irele Nigeria
- Education: University of Ibadan; University College Dublin; Penn State University
- Profession: Diplomat

Modupe Enitan Irele is a Nigerian diplomat and current Nigerian Ambassador to France, becoming the first female to hold the role since the diplomatic mission appointed its first representative in 1966. She was nominated by President Muhammadu Buhari on 20 October 2016, and presented her credentials to President Macron on 18 December 2017. She was appointed ambassador to Hungary in 2021.

== Career and education ==
Modupe Irele was born in Nigeria, and gained her Bachelor's degree in English with a minor in French from the University of Ibadan. She proceeded to gain her Master's from the same institution. Irele earned a second Master's degree in education from University College Dublin. In 1996, she earned her doctorate from Penn State University, focusing on Online Learning and Teacher Training.

Irele began her career in banking, spending 15 years as a retail banker, before venturing into education consulting. She runs her own educational consulting practice in Nigeria, Key Learning Solutions and served in the Faculty of Department and Learning and Performance Systems at the Penn State University Department of Education.
