= List of ambassadors of Madagascar to the United States =

Coordinates: 38°54′48.2″N 77°3′10.3″W

Ambassador of Madagascar to the United States Embassy of Madagascar in Washington, D.C.
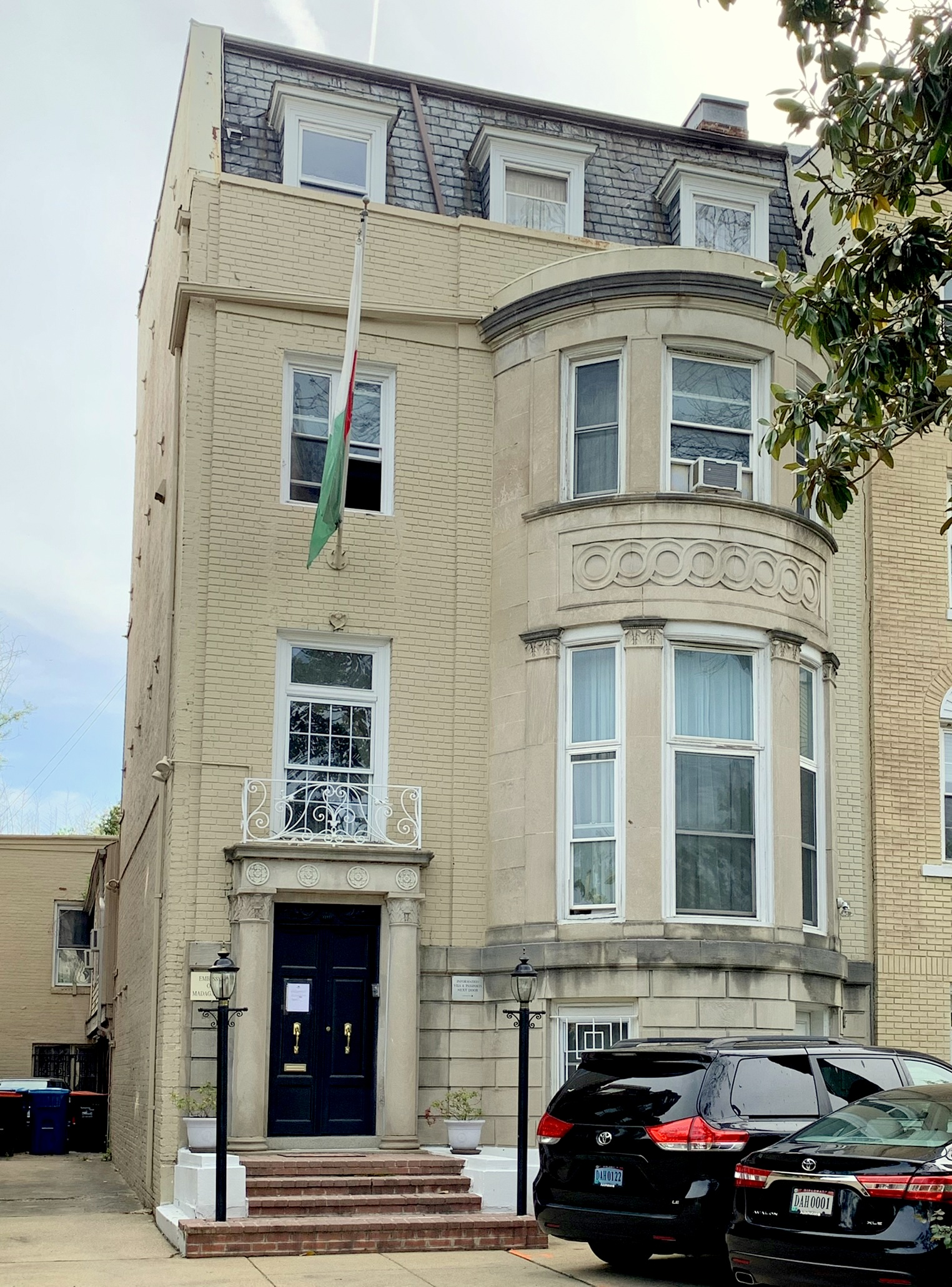
- Residence: 2374 Massachusetts Avenue, Northwest, Washington, D.C.
- Inaugural holder: Louis Rakotamalala
- Formation: December 5, 1960

The Malagasy ambassador in Washington, D. C. is the official representative of the Government in Antananarivo to the Government of the United States.

== List of representatives ==
Diplomatic agrément	Diplomatic accreditation	Ambassador	Observations	Prime Minister of Madagascar	List of presidents of the United States	Term end
December 5, 1960			Embassy Opened	Philibert Tsiranana	Dwight D. Eisenhower	
October 28, 1960	December 5, 1960	Louis Rakotamalala	(Died on January 7, 1968) Louis Rakotomalala, Ministre des Affaires étrangères.	Philibert Tsiranana	Dwight D. Eisenhower	
January 15, 1970	February 3, 1970	Jules Alphonse Razafimbahiny	(* April 19, 1922 in Mananjary). Son of Alphonse and Marguerite (nbe Ramasinoro) Razafimbahiny.: From 1962 to 1964 he was Secretary-General of OCAM.; From 1964 to 1965 he was Director-General at Madagascars Ministry of Foreign Affairs.; In 1965 he was appointed Ambassador to Britain with accreditation also to Italy, Greece and Israel.; From 1967 to February 3, 1970 he was State Secretary at the Foreign Ministry in Tananarive.	Philibert Tsiranana	Richard Nixon	
August 16, 1971		Apolinaire Andriatsiafajato	Agreement approved but name subsequently withdrawn: in 1961 he was Apolinaire Andriatsiafajato, executive secretary of the Social Democratic Party in the Malagasy Republic.; From 1981 to 1984 he was Ambassador in Tokyo.; From 1986 to 1988 he was Ambassador in Rome.	Philibert Tsiranana	Richard Nixon	
September 20, 1972	October 2, 1972	Henri Raharijaona	From 1981 to 1982 he was ambassador in Paris.; On 28 Feb. 1980 with accreditation in London.	Gabriel Ramanantsoa	Richard Nixon	
February 1, 1980		Henri Jux Ratsimbazafy	Chargé d'affaires	Désiré Rakotoarijaona	Jimmy Carter	
June 3, 1982	July 29, 1983	Benjamin Razafintseheno	In 1972 he was ambassador in Tokyo with accreditation in Taipei.	Désiré Rakotoarijaona	Ronald Reagan	
March 27, 1983		Jean Rene Rsiangalara	Chargé d'affaires	Désiré Rakotoarijaona	Ronald Reagan	
November 15, 1983	November 21, 1983	Leon Maxime Rajaobelina		Désiré Rakotoarijaona	Ronald Reagan	
December 4, 1989	December 20, 1989	Pierrot Jocelyn Rajaonarivelo		Victor Ramahatra	George H. W. Bush	
January 19, 1999	January 21, 1999	Zina Andrianarivelo-Razafy		Tantely Andrianarivo	Bill Clinton	
January 30, 2003	February 26, 2003	Narisoa Rajaonarivony		Jacques Sylla	George W. Bush	
September 17, 2007	September 18, 2007	Jocelyn Bertin Radifera	(*February 20, 1940 - November 14, 2013 in Washington, D.C.)	Charles Rabemananjara	George W. Bush	
June 20, 2011		Velotiana Rakotoanosy Raobelina		Albert Camille Vital	Barack Obama	November 2, 2011

== See also ==
- Embassy of Madagascar in Washington, D.C.
