= Carmen María Gallardo Hernández =

Salvadoran diplomat

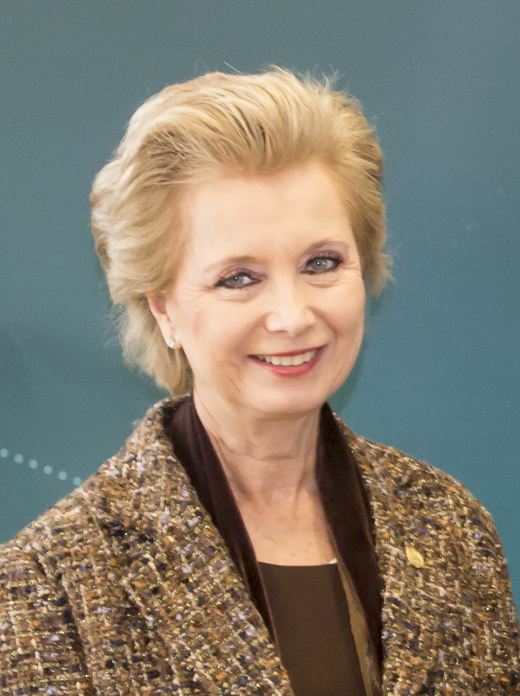

El Salvador Ambassador and Permanent Delegate to UNESCO to France
- In office 1992–1994

El Salvador El Salvador ambassador to UNESCO
- In office 1994–1995
- Preceded by: Armando Chavez Viaud
- Succeeded by: José Ramiro Zepeda Roldan

El Salvador Permanent Representative of El Salvador to the United Nations to United Nations
- In office 2004–2010
- Preceded by: Victor Manuel Lagos
- Succeeded by: Joaquín A. Maza-Martelli

El Salvador Ambassador of El Salvador to Austria
- In office 2014–2016
- Preceded by: Mario Antonio Rivera Mora

El Salvador El Salvador ambassador to France
- In office 2016–2019

Personal details
- Born: November 28, 1949 (age 76) San Salvador, El Salvador

Carmen María Gallardo Hernández (born 28 November 1949) is a Salvadoran diplomat. Gallardo Hernández's career has established her as a prominent figure and proponent of both bilateralism and multilateralism relations. She has served in key diplomatic posts abroad and has served in a wide variety of representative roles in the United Nations and other international organizations.

== Education ==
Ambassador Gallardo Hernandez spent most of her school years in Paris, France and obtained a French Baccalaureate in Philosophy and Literature.

She then moved to Geneva where she obtained both a bachelor's degree in translation (English, Spanish and French) and a master's degree in parliamentary interpretation from the University of Geneva.

Gallardo Hernandez went on to receive a bachelor's degree in clinical psychology from the Universidad Iberoamericana in Mexico City.

== Career ==
=== Career overview ===
- From 1992 to 1994 she was appointed as El Salvador's ambassador and permanent delegate to UNESCO.
- In 1993, she was a champion of the 'Culture of Peace' programme, organizing among other things, the first International Forum on Culture of Peace in San Salvador.
- From 1994 to 1995 she was concurrently appointed as ambassador to France and non-resident ambassador to Portugal; continuing as the Permanent Delegate of El Salvador to UNESCO.
- From 1995 to 1996 she served as the executive director of the Salvadoran Foundation for Peace (FUNDAPAZ), an NGO formed after the Chapultepec Peace Accords which brought to an end the 12-year Salvadoran Civil War in 1992.
- From 1998 to 2003, involved in national (El Salvador) politics.
- From 1996 to 2004, she was an international affairs columnist for La Prensa Gráfica and El Diario.
- From 2003 to 2004, she served as Coordinator for International Cooperation for El Salvador's Supreme Court of Justice.
- From 2004 to 2010 Gallardo Hernandez served as Ambassador and Permanent Representative of El Salvador to the United Nations in New York City.
- From 2012 to 2014 she was elected to the Municipal council of San Salvador in charge of international cooperation.
- From 2014 to 2016, she served as ambassador and Permanent Representative to the international organizations in Vienna including the UN Office on Drugs and Crime (UNODC).
- Since August 2016, she has concurrently served as ambassador to France (for the second time) and non-resident ambassador to Portugal, Monaco and Algeria.

=== Multiculturalism ===
Gallardo Hernandez's vision for the world is founded upon multilateralism. Throughout her career, she has engaged herself in various projects with the aim of the bringing together and enhancement of humanitarian values through education, culture and the exchange of knowledge.

These engagements have very much been inspired by the dynamic transition of violence to a 'Culture of Peace' in her native El Salvador. Particularly, Gallardo Hernandez is interested in discovering new ways to involve youth and women in the peace building processes. She believes that it is not only crucial for sustainable peace but is invaluable for them to reach their personal goals and aspirations in life.

==== New York (2004–2010) ====
From 2004 to 2010 Gallardo Hernandez served as Ambassador and Permanent Representative of El Salvador to the United Nations in New York City. In doing so, she became El Salvador's very first female diplomat.

During her tenure, she formalized El Salvador's registration as a Troop Contributor Country (TCC) and served as:

- President of the United Nations Development Program (UNDP) and the United Nations Population Fund (UNPF) Executive Board.
- Vice-chairperson of the UN's newly created Peacebuilding Commission.
- Chairperson of the United Nations Commission on the Status of Women (UNCSW).
- Vice President of the United Nations' Economic and Social Council (ECOSOC).
- Vice-president of the United Nations General Assembly.
- Vice President of the United Nations' Peacebuilding Commission (PBC).
- East West Institute board member.

==== Vienna (2014–2016) ====
As Ambassador and Permanent Representative to the international organizations in Vienna, Gallardo Hernandez served in a wide range of roles:

- Board member representative for El Salvador at the UN Office on Drugs and Crime (UNODC).
- She was appointed as the Latin American coordinator to the UNGASS conference (New York 2015).
- Introduced El Salvador as member of International Anti-Corruption Academy (IACA).
- Board member representative for El Salvador on the Commission on Crime Prevention and Criminal Justice.
- Formalized El Salvador's membership to the United Nations' Committee on the Peaceful Uses of Outer Space (COPUOS).
- During this time, Gallardo Hernandez was concurrently the Ambassador of El Salvador to the UN in Vienna, the Ambassador to Austria and non-resident ambassador to Slovakia, Croatia, Hungary, Romania and Bulgaria.

==== Paris (2016 – 2019) ====
While based in Paris as Ambassador to France and Permanent Delegate to UNESCO, Gallardo Hernandez assisted in El Salvador's election to the UNESCO Executive Board after 32 years of prior member state membership.

Gallardo Hernandez fully participated in the conceptual process and secured financial support of the 'Culture of Peace' programme. She then advocated for the programme to the UNESCO Executive Board, receiving their full support along with that of Director-General Federico Mayor Zaragoza.

Among others, the program was initiated in her home country of El Salvador.

During her tenure at UNESCO, Joya de Cerén was incorporated as El Salvador's first World Heritage Site.

=== Bilateral diplomatic assignments ===
From 1993 to 1994, Gallardo Hernandez served as Ambassador France, Portugal and Monaco.

From 2014 to 2016, she served as Ambassador to Austria and as non-resident Ambassador Bulgaria, Croatia, Slovakia, Hungary and Romania.

Since August 2016, Gallardo Hernandez has lived in Paris, serving as Ambassador to France, for the second time. Concurrently, she is serving as the non-resident ambassador to Monaco, Portugal and Algeria.

== Awards & honors ==
Ambassador Gallardo Hernandez has received numerous accolades over the years including being named 'Professional of the Year' by the El Salvador Bar Association in 1997 and a "Doctor Honoris Causa" in International Relations from the Technological University of El Salvador in 1998.

Gallardo Hernandez has also been honored with the title of "Dame of Grace and Devotion" from the Sovereign Military Order of Malta.

== Personal life ==
Born on 28 November 1949 in San Salvador, Ambassador Gallardo Hernández is married to F. Xavier Hernández, an international executive, and has two children and five grandchildren. She is fluent in French, English and Spanish and is also proficient in Italian and German.

== Sources ==
- Foreign Ministry of El Salvador
- UN: Inaugural session of Peacebuilding Commission
