= Narisoa Rajaonarivony =

Malagasy diplomat and politician

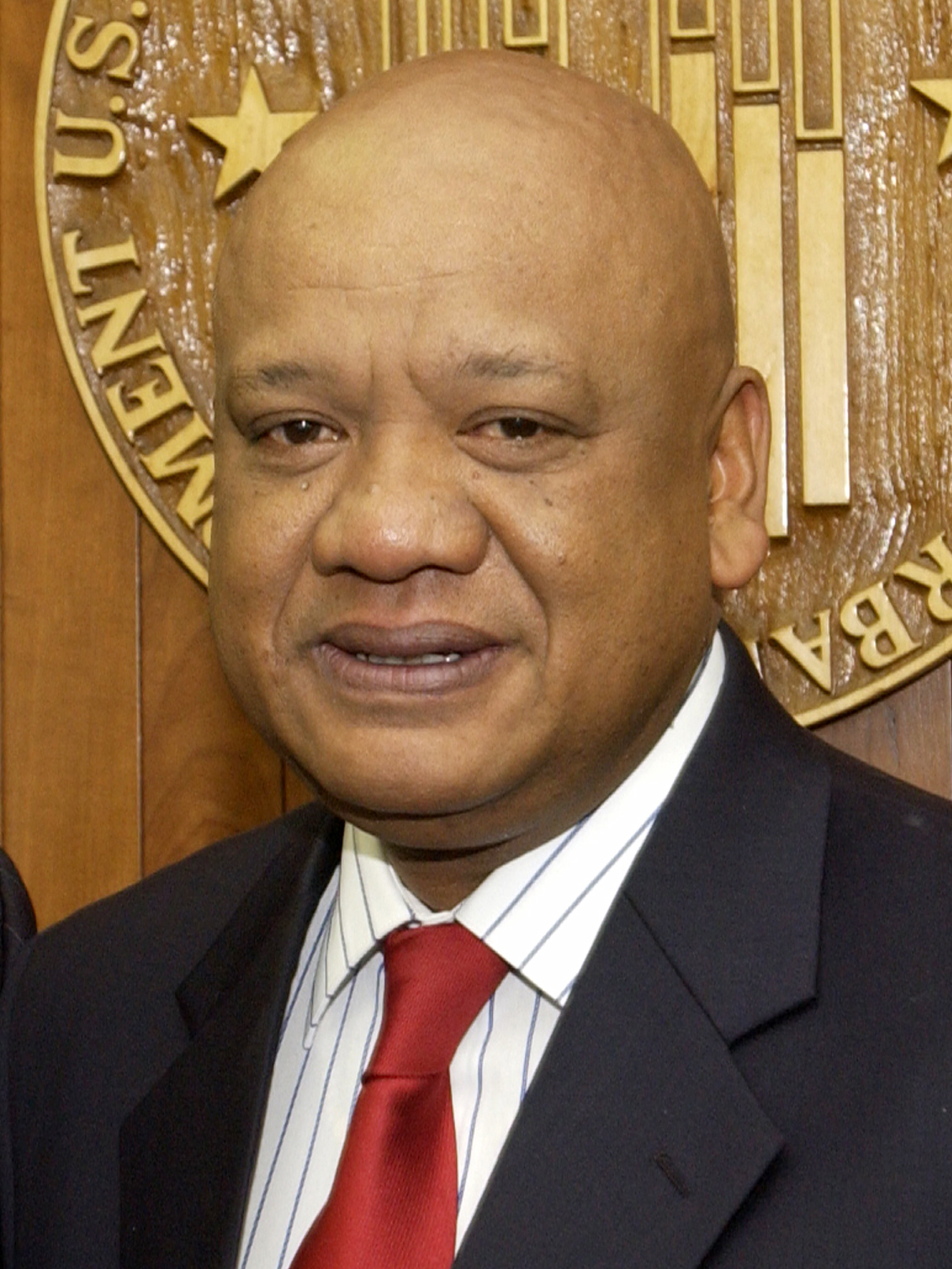
Rajaonarivony in 2006

Narisoa Rajaonarivony (1955-2011) was a Malagasy diplomat and politician. He was Madagascar's Ambassador to France. Previously he was Deputy Prime Minister in charge of the Economy, Finance and the Budget in 2002, then Ambassador to the United States beginning in 2003.

Rajaonarivony was a long-time associate of Marc Ravalomanana; together with Ravalomanana, he founded the Tiko Farm in 1988. When Ravalomanana, who claimed to have won the December 2001 presidential election against President Didier Ratsiraka, was sworn in as president by his supporters (despite Ratsiraka's continuing claims to the office), he appointed Rajaonarivony as Deputy Prime Minister in charge of the Economy, Finance and the Budget in his first government, named on March 1, 2002. Rajaonarivony left the government on October 7, 2002. On February 26, 2003, he became Ambassador to the United States; he additionally presented his credentials as Ambassador to Colombia to Colombian President Álvaro Uribe on November 21, 2003 and as Ambassador to Mexico to Mexican President Vicente Fox on August 18, 2004.

After five years as Ambassador to the US, Rajaonarivony was appointed as Ambassador to France in early January 2008; he was additionally accredited for Spain, the United Kingdom, the Vatican City, and Israel. After a significant wait, he presented his credentials to French President Nicolas Sarkozy on 22 April 2008. He also presented his credentials as Ambassador to the Vatican City to Pope Benedict XVI on 18 December 2008. After Ravalomanana's March 2009 ouster, President Andry Rajoelina dismissed Rajaonarivony, who was considered a Ravalomanana loyalist, from his posting in France on 27 March 2009. However, in mid-May 2009, the High Constitutional Court ruled that he and four other dismissed ambassadors should remain in their posts.

Rajaonarivony was an alumnus of Auburn University, University of Pittsburgh and the University of Madagascar. He was married with three children.
