= Raffaele Ulisse Barbolani =

Italian journalist

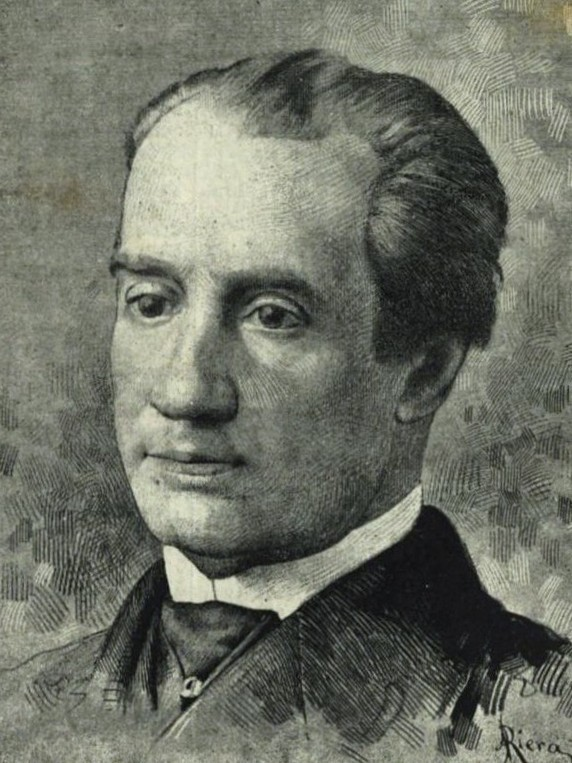
Raffaele Ulisse Barbolani

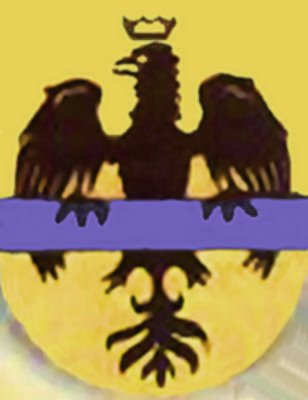
Coat of arms of the Barbolani family of Montauto

Count Raffaele Ulisse Barbolani (Chieti, April 30, 1818 – Palena, October 17, 1900) was an Italian diplomat and journalist, Secretary General of the Ministry of Foreign Affairs (1867–1869) and passionate about Japanese Culture.

== Biography ==
=== Barbolani diplomat of the Kingdom of the Two Sicilies and liberal journalist ===
Descending from a branch of the Tuscan family Barbolani di Montauto who moved to Abruzzo, Raffaele Ulisse Barbolani entered the diplomacy of Kingdom of the Two Sicilies in 1847; at the same time he collaborates for foreign policy news with Il Nazionale , a newspaper founded in February 1848 by Silvio Spaventa. The newspaper represented a point of reference for the liberal bourgeoisie but was also influential among conservatives and pro-Bourbonists.

=== The diplomatic career for the Kingdom of Italy ===
At the fall of the Kingdom of the Two Sicilies (1860), Barbolani, a charge d'affaires in Rio de Janeiro, was placed at the disposal of the Garibaldi dictatorial government. Later, he is admitted into the diplomacy of Kingdom of Italy and takes up service in Turin, at Ministry of Foreign Affairs. In 1863 he is in charge of affairs in Montevideo. From 1867 to 1869 Ulisse Barbolani was appointed Secretary General of the Ministry of Foreign Affairs by the prime minister and interim minister Luigi Federico Menabrea; when the third Menabrea Cabinet took office, however, he was alternated in the office by Alberto Blanc. Subsequently Barbolani was extraordinary envoy and plenipotentiary minister to Constantinople and Petersburg (1870–1876). In 1875, in Colledimacine - where his family owns an Ancient palace – marries Sofia Eugenia Giustina Teti. The year before, at his own expense, he had the bell tower of the Church of San Rocco built there, as shown in the appropriate plaque.

=== Barbolani in Japan ===
In 1877, Raffaele Ulisse Barbolani was sent as plenipotentiary minister to Tokyo, where he remained for about four years. Barbolani manages with intelligence and skill the visit of the prince Thomas to the emperor Meiji, winning the trust of the Japanese government and the sympathy of the imperial court, so much so that, a few years later, a Japanese minister declared that "in classifying the European powers in relation to the sympathy they enjoy in Japan, Italy occupied the first place, Russia the second and Germany the third". Ulysses Barbolani is responsible for the preservation of a precious collection of photographs of ancient Japan, discovered a few years ago in Pescara and published by the Japanese publishing house Heibonsha 平凡 社. The collection, found among the diplomat's papers, is presented as a complete photographic record of the whole country. The album collects 1268 photographs, distributed throughout Japan and perfectly ordered by regions, cities and neighborhoods, with the indication written in Japanese and French, for each photograph. The images have effectively returned to a period in which the greatest changes that the Japanese history had known and which, otherwise, would have been without documentation were taking place. Raffaele Ulisse Barbolani ended his diplomatic career as plenipotentiary minister in Munich.

== See also ==
- Ministry of Foreign Affairs (Italy)
- Foreign relations of Italy

== Bibliography ==
- Di Russo, Marisa (1999). "Raffaele Ulisse Barbolani. Un diplomatico abruzzese nel Giappone di fine Ottocento". Oggi e Domani. CCLXX (10): 3–12.

Preceded by Alessandro Fè d'Ostiani	Italian ambassador to the Japanese Empire; 1877–1882	Succeeded by Eugenio Martin Lanciarez
Preceded by Alessandro Fè d'Ostiani	Italian Ambassador to the Chinese Empire; 1877–1878	Succeeded by Ferdinando De Luca
Preceded by Camillo Caracciolo di Bella	Italian ambassador to the Russian Empire; 1870–1876	Succeeded by Costantino Nigra
Preceded by Giuseppe Bertinatti	Italian ambassador to the Ottoman Empire; 1869–1875	Succeeded by Luigi Corti
Preceded by Luigi Melegari	Secretary General of the Ministry of Foreign Affairs; 1867–1869	Succeeded by Alberto Blanc
Preceded by –	Italian ambassador to Argentina; 1863–1866	Succeeded by Luigi Joannini Ceva di San Michele
