= Amara Camara =

Guinean diplomat (died 2023)

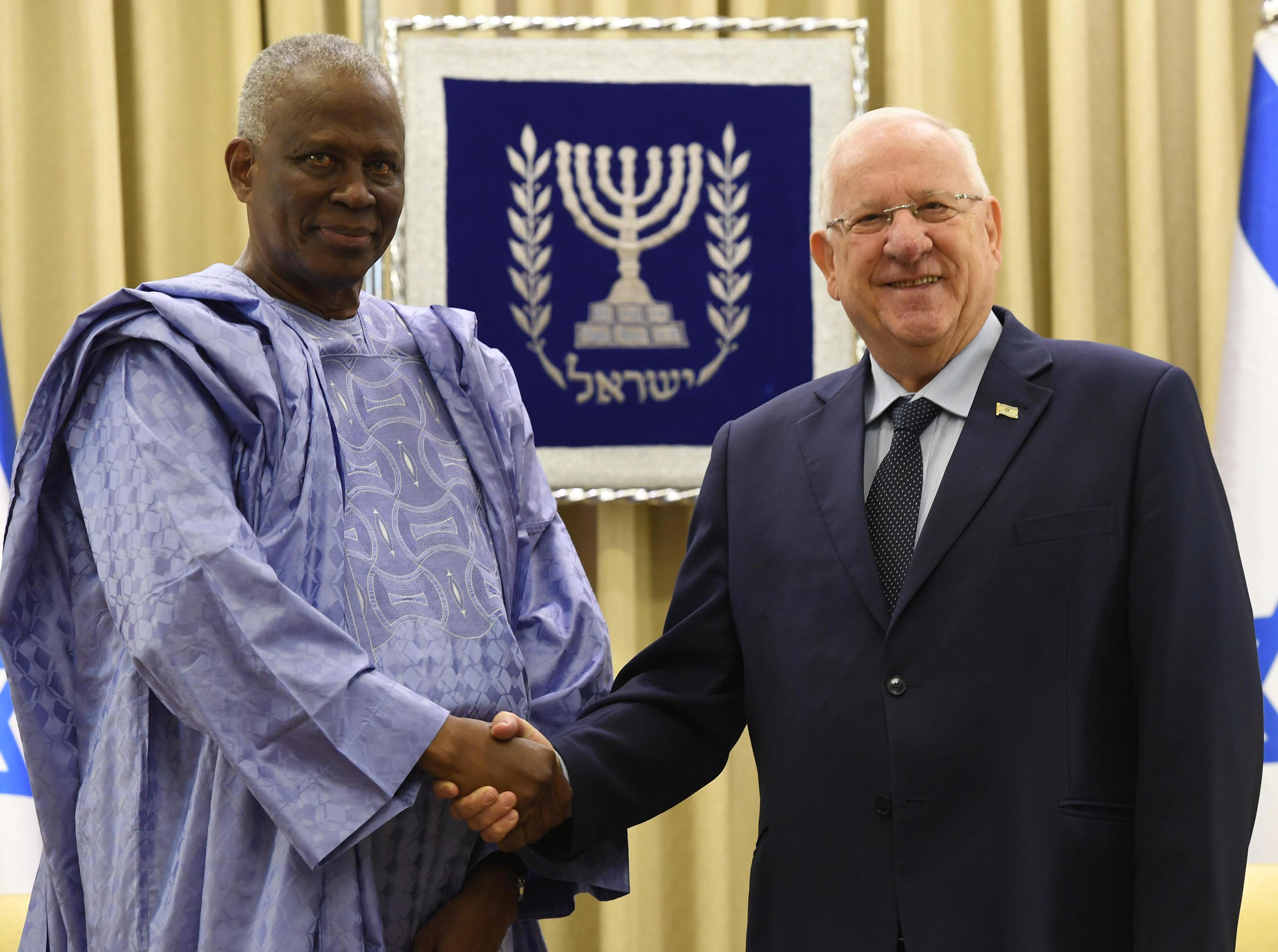
- Camara in 2017 with Israeli President Reuven Rivlin

Ambassador of Guinea to Israel
- In office 5 May 2017 – 3 February 2022

Ambassador of Guinea to Portugal
- In office 29 March 2011 – 3 February 2022

Ambassador of Guinea to France
- In office 29 March 2011 – 3 February 2022

Personal details
- Born: Guinea
- Died: September 9, 2023 Paris, France
- Education: Paris 1 Panthéon-Sorbonne University
- Occupation: Diplomat

Amara Camara (died 9 September 2023) was a Guinean diplomat.

== Biography ==
Born in Guinea, Camara studied public law at Paris 1 Panthéon-Sorbonne University. He began working for UNESCO on 2 August 1971 in Paris. From 1975 to 1980, he was head of a correspondence unit in the office of the Deputy Director General for External Cooperation. He returned to Africa in 1980 and began working for the UNESCO office in Kinshasa as an equipment administrator for projects in Zaire. After a year, he returned to Paris and became a scholarship administrator for Africa and Latin America. In 1985, he went to Senegal as an administrator for the regional office for education in Africa (BREDA). He then returned in 2001 as deputy director of BREDA. From 2003 to 2009, he was dean of the college of mediators of UNESCO, having helped resolve multiple conflicts between UNESCO staff and national administrations. On 13 November 2013, he became a member of UNESCO's advisory board, participating in numerous conferences on economic development, international cooperation, promotion of democracy, and good governance.

Under President Alpha Condé, Camara was appointed Ambassador of Guinea to France on 29 March 2011, as well as Ambassador to Portugal at the same time. On 5 May 2017, he was appointed Ambassador to Israel. On 3 February 2022, in the wake of the 2021 coup d'état, he was recalled to Guinea, as were 34 other Guinean ambassadors abroad.

Camara was the founding president of the Association de lutte contre la pauvreté (KOSIMANKAN), working on projects to create an educational center and a health center for underprivileged children, which covered 200 districts in the Siguiri Prefecture and the Kankan Prefecture.

Amara Camara died in Paris on 9 September 2023.
