= Gulsara Arystanqulova =

Kazakh diplomat

Gülsara Arystanqūlova
- Гүлсара Арыстанқұлова

Kazakh Ambassador to France and Monaco
- Incumbent
- Assumed office 23 July 2022
- President: Kassym-Jomart Tokayev
- Preceded by: Jan Galiev

Kazakh permanent delegate to UNESCO
- In office 29 December 2022 – 14 August 2023
- President: Kassym-Jomart Tokayev
- Preceded by: Jan Galiev
- Succeeded by: Asqar Abdirakhmanov

Personal details
- Born: 15 October 1971 (age 54) Jambyl Region, Kazakh SSR, Soviet Union
- Education: Academy of Public Administration
- Alma mater: Kazakh State University of World Languages; University of Strasbourg

Gülsara Mereyqyzy Arystanqūlova (Note: Often transliterated as Gulsara Mereyevna Arystankulova through a Russified Romanization of Гульсара Мереевна Арыстанкулова.) (Kazakh: Гүлсара Мерейқызы Арыстанқұлова; born 15 October 1971) is a Kazakh diplomat serving as ambassador to France and Monaco since 2022.

== Early life and education ==
Arystanqūlova was born on 15 October 1971 in Jambyl Region, Kazakh Soviet Socialist Republic, Soviet Union (now Jambyl Region, Kazakhstan).

In 1994, a friend from her studies at the Kazakh State University of World Languages (now Kazakh Ablai Khan University of International Relations and World Languages) enrolled her in the selection process for the first group of students sent abroad under the Bolashak Presidential Scholarship program. She successfully passed the selection and was assigned to study at the University of Strasbourg’s School of Humanities (now University of Strasbourg). She later graduated from the Academy of Public Administration under the President of Kazakhstan.

== Career ==
After completing her studies in Strasbourg in 1998, she joined the Embassy of Kazakhstan in Belgium as an attaché.

From 1998 to 2003, she worked at the Ministry of Foreign Affairs of Kazakhstan as second secretary, then first secretary, of the CIS Affairs Committee, and later as head of the International Information Department of the Committee.

From 2003 to 2007, she served as second secretary and then first secretary at the Embassy of Kazakhstan in France.

In 2008, she returned to Kazakhstan and joined the Department of Foreign Policy and International Relations of the Presidential Administration, first as a consultant and then, until 2022, as deputy Head of the Department.

On 23 July, 2022, by decree of President Tokayev, she was appointed Ambassador of Kazakhstan to France.

On 29 December of the same year, Tokayev additionally appointed her ambassador to Monaco and presentative to UNESCO. On 14 August, 2023, she was relieved of her position as presentative to UNESCO.

== Initiative ==
On 8 March 2023, at Arystanqūlova's initiative, the Association of Kazakh Women in France "QazElles" was established in France to promote the country’s image.

== Rank ==
Arystanqūlova holds the diplomatic rank of Ambassador Extraordinary and Plenipotentiary 2nd class.
