= Shanga (singer) =

Swiss–Nigerian singer-songwriter

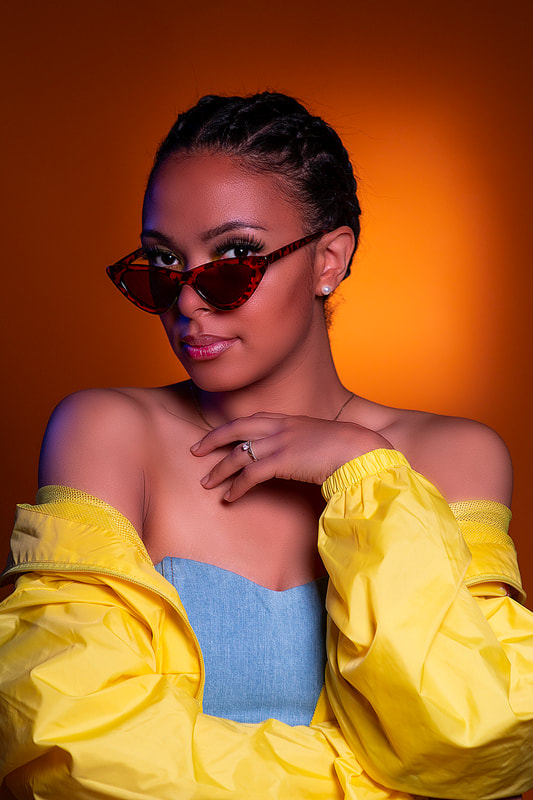
- Shanga in 2020

Background information
- Born: Manuela Modupe Udemba; Bern, Switzerland
- Genres: Afro-rhythmic soul
- Occupations: Singer; songwriter; record producer; audio engineer
- Instrument: Vocals . guitars . keyboards
- Years active: 2013–present
- Label: chop knocku
- Website: https://www.shangaofficial.com/

Manuela Modupe Udemba, known professionally as Shanga, is a Swiss–Nigerian singer-songwriter, audio engineer, and record producer. Born in Bern, Switzerland, she decided to pursue a music career after becoming a certified audio engineer.

== Early life ==
Shanga was raised between Nigeria and Switzerland, where she completed her elementary and high school. After her tertiary education, she enrolled in an audio engineering school in Hamburg.

== Career ==
Shanga released her debut Extended Play (EP), embracing vulnerability, in 2013. In 2014, newspaper Der Bund praised her artistic work and musical style. Between 2018 and 2019, Shanga released the singles "Chuchichäschtli", "Sweeter than Wine" and "Show Me". In April 2020, she released "Certified", the lead single from her debut album Bold. A fusion of afro and grime, the song was produced by Bisi Udemba and mastered by Ben Mühlethaler, the latter of whom is known for his work with Prince. Shanga released the album's second single, "Kelele", in July 2020. The song peaked at number one on the iTunes Swiss Charts and at number four on the Billboard Swiss Digital Sales Chart.

Shanga's debut studio album, Bold, was released in October 2020.

== Discography ==
Studio albums

- Bold (2020)
- Bold II (2025)

EPs

- embracing vulnerability (2013)
